= Digital component video =

Analog video signal transmission method

Digital component video is defined by the ITU-R BT.601 (formerly CCIR 601) standard and uses the Y'CbCr colorspace. The specific encoding of ITU-R BT.656 was used to transmit uncompressed analog standard-definition television component signals in a multiplexed digital format. Like analog component video, it gets its name from the fact that the video signal has been split into two or more components, that are then carried on multiple conductors between devices.

All uncompressed digital video are "component" in that they include separable R/G/B or Y/Cb/Cr color components, but are usually "composite" in that they are transmitted in a single stream of data. Y'CbCr is used in both computer and home-theatre applications. It was the internal signalling (as opposed to, e.g. RGB) in MiniDV, DV, and Digital Betacam.

BT.601 and BT.656 only define television-equivalent resolutions (480i, 576i). Other resolutions such as 480p, 576p, 720p, 1080i and 1080p are supported by other digital formats.

== See also ==
- Serial digital interface
- SMPTE 344M
- Enhanced-definition television
