= Cineon =

Computer based digital film system created by Kodak

Cineon Image File Format
- Filename extension: .cin
- Developed by: Kodak
- Type of format: Image file formats
- Extended to: DPX
- Standard: Draft 4.5
- Website: www.cineon.com

The Cineon System was one of the first computer based digital film systems, created by Kodak in the early 1990s. It was an integrated suite of components consisting a motion picture film scanner, a film recorder and workstation hardware with software (the Cineon Digital Film Workstation) for compositing, visual effects, image restoration and color management.

The system was first released in September 1992 to Cinesite Hollywood. The workstations were initially built on Inmos-Transputer based hardware. In July 1993 version 2.1.3 of the software was released for Silicon Graphics Inc, SGI Onyx hardware. The software was withdrawn from sale by 1997, although a number of customers continued to use it beyond that date. As an end-to-end solution for 4K resolution, 10 bit digital film production and digital intermediate, the system was one of the first. The three major components of the system (scanner, workstation software, and recorder) have all received separate AMPAS Scientific and Technical Awards.

The Cineon project was also responsible for the creation of the Cineon ( .cin) 10 bit log file format, designed to handle digital film frames. Although the product is no longer for sale, Cineon file format that Kodak defined was for a long time commonly used in the film visual effects world, and formed the basis for the newer SMPTE-standardised Digital Picture Exchange (DPX) format.

== Cineon file format ==
The Cineon file format was designed specifically to represent scanned film images, and thus has some differences from other formats such as TIFF and JPEG:

- The pixel data represents "printing density", the density that is seen by the print film. Thus, Cineon files are assumed to operate as part of a reproduction chain keeping whatever values are originally scanned from a negative or positive film. Any negative can be reproduced on the recorder retaining the original neg's characteristics (such as color component crosstalk and gamma correction) — and thereby retaining the negative's "look" if it were directly printed. The original Cineon color data metric printing densities were based upon 5244 intermediate film. Conversion of Cineon Printing Density (CPD) to Status-M can be estimated with a 3x3 matrix or by using tables contained in the Kodak "Digital LAD" document. This document shows a specific relation between Cineon Code values and Status-M densities.
- The data is stored in log format, directly corresponding to density of the original negative. Since the scanned material is likely a negative, the data can be said to be "gamma with log encoding".
- To evaluate original scene luminances from Cineon data, the camera negative characteristics must be known. (Such characterization is known as "unbuilding.") Such characterization is aided by exposing a sensitometric strip so that the actual developing gamma can be determined. The film can be unbuilt by using the unique per-layer contrasts of the color negative.
- In a Cineon (.cin) file, each channel (R, G, B) is 10 bits, packed 3 per 32-bit word, with two bits unused.
- Conversion to 8-bit integer format for display on computer monitors or transfer to video typically involves the notion of the "black point" and "white point" used for conversion to more limited range video signals. Conventionally, these points are 95 and 685 on the 0-1023 scale (but should be adjusted based upon actual negative content). Pixel values above 685 are "brighter than white", such as the sun, chrome highlights, etc. The concept of a "soft clip" was introduced to make the rolloff of whites appear more natural. Pixel values below 95 represent black values exposed on the negative (the clear base of the film). These values can descend in practice as low as pixel values 20 or 30.

Programs like FFmpeg and XnView report to support .cin and .dpx.

== Documentation ==
Conversions to the Cineon format were defined in a Kodak document by Glenn Kennel. The SMPTE standardized the format further into a related format called DPX which can store more varieties of image information as well as additional header information.

The Cineon 10 bits per pixel color space provides 1024 levels of color as opposed to 256 levels of color in 8 bits per pixel color space. 10 bit YUV and 10 bit RGB are the industry standard. The standard documented and recognized by the Society Of Motion Picture Television Engineers: SMPTE 259M, SMPTE 292M, SMPTE 296M, SMPTE 372M. A .fido file is a type of Cineon Graphics Data File format.

== History ==
From the late 1980s Glenn Kennel was the principal architect of the Cineon digital film system. Kennel led the development of the Cineon CCD film scanner and laser Film recorder (the Lightning film recorder) in Rochester NY. From February 1990, the Cineon workstation software was written by a team based at Kodak in Melbourne, Australia led by Lindsay Arnold. In early 1995, development moved to Kodak in Rochester, NY, where it was led by David Cok and Jim Minno. In about 1996, software development moved to Palo Alto, California.

The initial developers of the system received a Scientific and Engineering Award from the Academy of Motion Picture Arts and Sciences in February 2005. The system as commercially used contained the contributions of many additional scientists and engineers.

Kennel helped launch Kodak's Cinesite Digital Film Center in September 1992, which became the premier test site for Cineon. In 1993 Cinesite used Cineon in the digital restoration of Disney's Snow White and the Seven Dwarfs, which became the first film to be entirely scanned to digital files, manipulated, and recorded back to film. The restoration project was done entirely at 4K resolution and 10-bit color depth using the Cineon software to digitally remove dirt and scratches. After the end of Cineon, Glenn Kennel worked with Philips to extend the Spirit DataCine to Cineon-compatible digital file output, first applying it to the 1998 movie Pleasantville. Pleasantville was the first digital intermediate film scanned on a Spirit DataCine. This process produced the mix of B&W and color pictures. Philips licensed some of the technology from Kodak, mainly the front end (lens, optics and CCDs).

Some books mentioning the role of Cineon in digital imaging history are:

- Stephen Prince, Digital Visual Effects in Cinema: The Seduction of Reality. p 73 notes the place of Cineon in file restoration history.
- Mark Sawicki, Filming the Fantastic: A Guide to Visual Effects Cinematography. p. 113ff.

== See also ==
- Color grading
- Color suite
- Digital cinema
- Digital film
- Direct to disk recording
- Film industry
- Film stock
