= Low-definition television =

TV systems with screen resolution lower than standard-definition

Low-definition television (LDTV) refers to TV systems that have a lower screen resolution than standard-definition television systems. The term is usually used in reference to digital television, in particular when broadcasting at the same (or similar) resolution as low-definition analog television systems. Mobile DTV systems usually transmit in low definition, as do all slow-scan television systems.

== Sources ==
The Video CD format uses a progressive scan LDTV signal (352×240 or 352×288), which is half the vertical and horizontal resolution of full-bandwidth SDTV. However, most players will internally upscale VCD material to 480/576 lines for playback, as this is both more widely compatible and gives a better overall appearance. No motion information is lost due to this process, as VCD video is not high-motion and only plays back at 25 or 30 frames per second, and the resultant display is comparable to consumer-grade VHS video playback.

For the first few years of its existence, YouTube offered only one, low-definition resolution of 256x144 or 144p at 30~50 fps or less, later extending first to widescreen 426×240, then to gradually higher resolutions; once the video service had become well established and had been acquired by Google, it had access to Google's radically improved storage space and transmission bandwidth, and could rely on a good proportion of its users having high-speed internet connections, giving an overall effect reminiscent of early online video streaming attempts using RealVideo or similar services, where 160×120 at single-figure framerates was deemed acceptable to cater to those whose network connections could not sufficiently deliver 240p content.

=== Video games ===
Older video game consoles and home computers often generated a technically compliant analog 525-line NTSC or 625-line PAL signal, but only sent one field type rather than alternating between the two. This created a 262 or 312 line progressive scan signal (with half the vertical resolution), which in theory can be decoded on any receiver that can decode normal, interlaced signals.

Since the shadow mask and beam width of standard CRT televisions were designed for interlaced signals, these systems produced a distinctive fixed pattern of alternating bright and dark scan lines; many emulators for older systems offer video filters to recreate this effect. With the introduction of digital video formats these low-definition modes are usually referred to as 240p and 288p (with the standard definition modes being 480i and 576i).

With the introduction of 16-bit computers in the mid-1980s, such as the Atari ST and Amiga, followed by 16-bit consoles in the late 1980s and early 1990s, like the Sega Genesis and Super NES, outputting the standard interlaced resolutions was supported for the first time, but rarely used due to heavy demands on processing power and memory. Standard resolutions also had a tendency to produce noticeable flicker at horizontal edges unless employed quite carefully, such as using anti-aliasing, which was either not available or computationally exorbitant. Thus, progressive output with half the vertical remained the primary format on most games of the fourth and fifth generation consoles (including the Sega Saturn, the Sony PlayStation and the Nintendo 64).

With the advent of sixth generation consoles and the launch of the Dreamcast, standard interlaced resolution became more common, and progressive lower resolution usage declined.

More recent game systems tend to use only properly interlaced NTSC or PAL in addition to higher resolution modes, except when running games designed for older, compatible systems in their native modes. The PlayStation 2 generates 240p/288p if a PlayStation game calls for this mode, as do many Virtual Console emulated games on the Wii. Nintendo's official software development kit documentation for the Wii refers to 240p as 'non-interlaced mode' or 'double-strike'.

Shortly after the launch of the Wii Virtual Console service, many users with component video cables experienced problems displaying some Virtual Console games due to certain TV models/manufacturers not supporting 240p over a component video connection. Nintendo's solution was to implement a video mode that forces the emulator to output 480i instead of 240p, however, many games released prior were never updated.

== Teleconferencing LDTV ==
Sources of LDTV using standard broadcasting techniques include mobile TV services powered by DVB-H, 1seg, DMB, or ATSC-M/H. However, this kind of LDTV transmission technology is based on existing LDTV teleconferencing standards that have been in place since the late 1990s.

== Resolutions ==
Standard	Class	Resolution	Pixels	Aspect ratio	Notes
MMS-Small	96p	128×96	12,288	4:3	Lowest size recommended for use with 3GPP video transmitted by MMS to/from cellular phones, matching resolution of smallest generally used color cellphone screen.
QQVGA	120p	160×120	19,200	4:3	Used with some webcams and early colour-screen cellular phones, commonly used in early desktop computers and online video applications. Lowest commonly used video resolution.
QCIF Webcam	144p	176×144	25,344	SAR 11:9 / DAR 4:3	Approximately one-sixth analogue PAL resolution (one-half horizontal, one-third vertical). Also the size recommended for "medium" quality MMS videos.
144p	144p	192×144	27,648	4:3	The resolution 192×144 is used when 144p is selected on a fullscreen YouTube video.
YouTube 144p	144p	256×144	36,864	16:9	One tenth of 1440p. The lowest resolution on YouTube since 2013.
NES/Famicom (NTSC)	224p	256×224	57,344	8:7	Resolution outputted by the NTSC version of the Nintendo Entertainment System (NES), known as Famicom in Japan.
QnHD	180p	320×180	57,600	16:9	1 quarter of nHD (360p), hence the name "QnHD".
NES/Famicom/Dendy (PAL)	240p	256×240	61,440	16:15	Resolution outputted by the PAL version of the Nintendo Entertainment System (NES), known as Famicom in Japan and sold under the name "Dendy" in Russia.
222p	222p	400×222	88,800	16:9	Used in low-resolution Facebook widescreen videos.
QVGA, NTSC square pixel	240p	320×240	76,800	4:3	Comparable to "low resolution" output of many popular home computers and games consoles, including VGA "Mode X". Used in some webcams and for video recordings in early/budget digital cameras and cameraphones, and low-end smartphone screens. Original YouTube resolution. Maximum recommended size for "large" MMS videos.
SIF (525)	240p	352×240	84,480	SAR 22:15 / DAR 4:3	NTSC-standard VCD / super-long-play DVD. Narrow/tall pixels.
NTSC widescreen	240p	426×240	102,240	16:9	Same as current YouTube "240p" mode; screen resolution of some budget portable DVD players. Roughly one-third full NTSC resolution (half vertical, two-thirds horizontal).
CIF / SIF (625)	288p	352×288	101,376	SAR 11:9 / DAR 4:3	PAL-standard VCD / super-long-play DVD. Wide/short pixels. Also a common resolution in early webcam and video conferencing, and in advanced featurephones and smartphones of mid-2000s (ca 2006).
Widescreen CIF	288p	512×288	147,456	16:9	Widescreen version of 288p resolution
PSP	272p	480×272	130,560	30:17	Notionally 16:9 with slight left/right edge cropping. Used in many portable DVD player screens and other small-format devices besides.
360p	360p	480×360	172,800	4:3	Uncommon, used in some lower-mid-market smartphone screens and as an intermediate screen resolution for some 1990s videogames.
QuickTime File Format	320p	568×320	181,760	16:9	Used for .MOV files recorded with iPhone cameras.
nHD	360p	640×360	230,400	16:9	Current base resolution in YouTube, labelled as "360p".: The lowest and least computationally demanding resolution supported by hardware able to run mainstream desktop operating systems; the lowest interruption-free resolution with low-end broadband connections.; Typically used as the base "SD" standard by VoD services due to subjective similarity (and similar pixel counts) to a mid-grade free-to-air broadcast picture.; Effectively, the resolution offered by any higher-definition 16:9 video scaled down for a standard 640×480 (VGA) computer screen. Offers 75% of the pixel count of a true anamorphic NTSC DVD image, or 89% of a letterboxed 16:9 image.; Historically used as an ad-hoc standard for intermediate-quality / CD-R-sized MPEG4 conversions on P2P file sharing networks.

== See also ==
- List of common resolutions
- 8640p, 4320p, 2160p, 1080p, 1080i, 720p, 576p, 576i, 480p, 480i
- Digital television
- Digital radio
- DVB, ATSC, ISDB
- SDTV, EDTV, HDTV
- Narrow-bandwidth television
- Moving Pictures Experts Group
- Handheld television
