= SMPTE 424M =

Serial digital interface for video transport

SMPTE 424M is a standard published by SMPTE which expands upon SMPTE 259M, SMPTE 344M, and SMPTE 292M allowing for bit-rates of 2.970 Gbit/s and 2.970/1.001 Gbit/s over a single-link coaxial cable. These bit-rates are sufficient for 1080p video at 50 or 60 frames per second. The initial 424M standard was published in 2006, with a revision published in 2012 (SMPTE ST 424:2012). This standard is part of a family of standards that define a serial digital interface (SDI); it is commonly known as 3G-SDI.

== Formats ==
Within this standard, there are three formats:

- Level A format is the direct mapping of uncompressed 1080p (up to 60 fps) video into a serial digital interface at the nominal 3 Gbit/s. That is, one video signal, one video stream, in one cable.
- Level B-DL format is the mapping of dual-link HD-SDI/SMPTE 372M (i.e.: 1080p up to 60 fps) in a single serial digital interface at the nominal 3 Gbit/s. That is, one video signal, two streams, in one cable.
- Level B-DS format is the dual-stream carriage of two independent HD-SDI/SMPTE 292M signals (720p up to 60 fps or 1080i/1080p up to 30 fps) in a single serial digital interface at the nominal 3 Gbit/s. That is, two video signals, two video streams, in one cable.
