= SMPTE 292 =

Digital video transmission line standard

SMPTE 292, originally SMPTE 292M, is a digital video transmission line standard published by the Society of Motion Picture and Television Engineers (SMPTE). This technical standard is usually referred to as HD-SDI; it is part of a family of standards that define a serial digital interface based on a coaxial cable, intended to be used for transport of uncompressed digital video and audio in a television studio environment.

SMPTE 292 expands upon SMPTE 259 and SMPTE 344 allowing for bit-rates of 1.485 Gbit/s, and 1.485/1.001 Gbit/s. These bit-rates are sufficient for and often used to transfer uncompressed high-definition video.

== Nomenclature ==
The "M" designator was originally introduced to signify metric dimensions. It is no longer used in listings or filenames. Units of the International System of Units (SI) are the preferred units of measurement in all SMPTE Engineering Documents.

== Technical details ==
The SMPTE 292 standard is a nominally 1.5 Gbit/s interface. Two exact bitrates are defined; 1.485 Gbit/s, and 1.485/1.001 Gbit/s. The factor of 1/1.001 is provided to allow SMPTE 292 to support video formats with frame rates of 59.94 Hz, 29.97 Hz, and 23.98 Hz, in order to be upwards compatible with existing NTSC systems. The 1.485 Gbit/s version of the standard supports other frame rates in widespread use, including 60 Hz, 50 Hz, 30 Hz, 25 Hz, and 24 Hz.

The standard also defines nominal bitrates of 3 Gbit/s, for 50/60 frame per second 1080p applications. This version of the interface is not used (and has not been commercially implemented); instead, either a dual-link extension of SMPTE 292M known as SMPTE 372 or a version running twice as fast known as SMPTE 424 is used for e.g. 1080p60 applications.

=== Electrical interface ===
Originally, both electrical and optical interfaces were defined by SMPTE, over concerns that an electrical interface at that bitrate would be expensive or unreliable, and that an optical interface would be necessary. Such goons have not been realized, and the optical interfaces are seldom if ever used, and are likely to be deprecated in future revisions of the standard.

The cabling used for the SMPTE 292 electrical interface is coaxial cable with a nominal impedance of 75 Ω. Data is encoded in NRZ format, and a linear feedback shift register is used to scramble the data to reduce the likelihood that long strings of zeroes or ones will be present on the interface. The interface is self-clocking. Framing is done by detection of a special synchronization pattern, which appears on the (unscrambled) serial digital signal to be a sequence of twenty ones followed by forty zeroes; this bit pattern is not legal anywhere else within the data payload.

The SMPTE 292 digital interface is known to be reliable (without use of repeaters) at cable lengths of 100 m or greater.

=== Data format ===
The corresponding parallel data formats, defined by SMPTE 274, SMPTE 296, and several other standards, are 20-bit standards; thus SMPTE 292M uses a 20-bit word size. Each 20-bit word consists of two 10-bit datums, coming from two logical (and parallel) data channels, one ("Y") which encodes luminance video samples, the other ("C") which encodes chrominance information. The C channel is further time-multiplexed into two half-bandwidth channels, known as Cr (the "red color difference" channel), and Cb (the "blue color difference" channel). The nominal datarate of the Y channel is 75 Mwords/sec (1.5 Gbit/s divided by 20), and the nominal datarate of each of the two chroma channels is 37.5 Mwords/sec.

Video payload (as well as ancillary data payload) may use any 10-bit word in the range 4 to 1019 (004 to 3FB in hexadecimal) inclusive; the values 0-3 and 1020-1023 (3FC - 3FF) are reserved and may not appear anywhere in the payload. These reserved words have two purposes, for synchronization packets, and for ancillary data headers.

==== Synchronization packets ====
A synchronization packet occurs immediately before the first active sample on every line, and immediately after the last active sample (and before the start of the horizontal blanking region). The synchronization packet consists of four 10-bit words. The first three words are always the same—0x3FF, 0, 0; the fourth consists of 3 flag bits, along with an error correcting code. As a result, there are 8 different synchronization packets possible.

Synchronization packets must occur simultaneously in both the Y and C datastreams.

The flags bits found in the fourth word are known as H, F, and V. The H bit indicates the start of horizontal blank; and synchronization bits immediately preceding the horizontal blanking region must have H set to one. Such packets are commonly referred to as End of Active Video, or EAV packets. Likewise, the packet appearing immediately before the start of the active video has H set to 0; this is the Start of Active Video or SAV packet.

Likewise, The V bit is used to indicate the start of the vertical blanking region; an EAV packet with V=1 indicates the following line (lines are deemed to start EAV) is part of the vertical interval, an EAV packet with V=0 indicates the following line is part of the active picture.

The F bit is used in interlaced and progressive segmented frame formats to indicate whether the line comes from the first or second field (or segment). In progressive scan formats, the F bit is always set to zero.

Other than the fact that synchronization packets occur in parallel in two datastreams (Y and C), their behavior is virtually identical to the packet types defined in CCIR 601 and SMPTE 259, the digital interface commonly used for SDTV.

==== Line counter and CRC ====
To provide additional robustness, the four samples immediately following the EAV packets (but not the SAV packets) contain a cyclic redundancy check field, and a line count indicator. The CRC field provides a CRC of the preceding line (CRCs are computed independently for the Y and C streams), and can be used to detect bit errors in the interface. The line count field indicates the line number of the current line.

==== Ancillary data ====
Like SMPTE 259, SMPTE 292 supports the SMPTE 291 standard for ancillary data. Ancillary data is provided as a standardized transport for non-video payload within a serial digital signal; it is used for things such as embedded audio, closed captions, timecode, and other sorts of metadata. Ancillary data is indicated by a 3-word packet consisting of 0, 3FF, 3FF (the opposite of the synchronization packet header), followed by a two-word identification code, a data count word (indicating 0 - 255 words of payload), the actual payload, and a one-word checksum. Other than in their use in the header, the codes prohibited to video payload are also prohibited to ancillary data payload.

==== Video payload ====
Within the active portion of the video, the data words correspond to signal levels of the respective video components. The luminance (Y) channel is defined such that a signal level of 0 mV is assigned the codeword 64 (40 hex), and 700 millivolts (full scale) is assigned the codeword 940 (3AC) . For the chroma channels, 0 mV is assigned the code word 512 (200 hex), -350mV is assigned a code word of 64 (0x40), and +350mV is assigned a code word of 960 (3C0). Note that the scaling of the luma and chroma channels is not identical. The minimum and maximum of these ranges represent the preferred signal limits, though the video payload may venture outside these ranges (providing that the reserved code words of 0 - 3 and 1020 - 1023 are never used for video payload).

For portions of the vertical and horizontal blanking regions which are not used for ancillary data, it is recommended that the luma samples be assigned the code word 64 (40 hex), and the chroma samples be assigned 512 (200 hex); both of which correspond to 0 mV. It is permissible to encode analog vertical interval information (such as vertical interval timecode or vertical interval test signals) without breaking the interface, but such usage is nonstandard (and ancillary data is the preferred means for transmitting metadata). Conversion of analog sync and burst signals into digital, however, is not recommended—and neither is necessary in the digital interface.

==== Emmy award ====
On July 31, 2013 it was announced that SMPTE won a Technology & Engineering Emmy Award for 2013 by the National Academy of Television Arts and Sciences. The honor recognized the society’s work on development, standardization, and productization of SMPTE 292.

== Related SMPTE standards ==
- Society of Motion Picture and Television Engineers: SMPTE 274M-2005: Image Sample Structure, Digital Representation and Digital Timing Reference Sequences for Multiple Picture Rates
- Society of Motion Picture and Television Engineers: SMPTE 292M-1998: Bit-Serial Digital Interface for High Definition Television
- Society of Motion Picture and Television Engineers: SMPTE 291M-1998: Ancillary Data Packet and Space Formatting
- Society of Motion Picture and Television Engineers: SMPTE 372M-2002: Dual Link 292M Interface for 1920 x 1080 Picture Raster

== See also ==
- SMPTE Standard SMPTE ST 292-1:2018: 1.5 Gb/s Signal/Data Serial Interface, Revision of SMPTE ST 292-1:2012
- Proposed SMPTE Standard SMPTE 292M: Bit-Serial Digital Interface for High-Definition Television Systems for Television, Revision of ANSI/SMPTE 292M-1996
