= DVD player =

Device that plays DVD discs

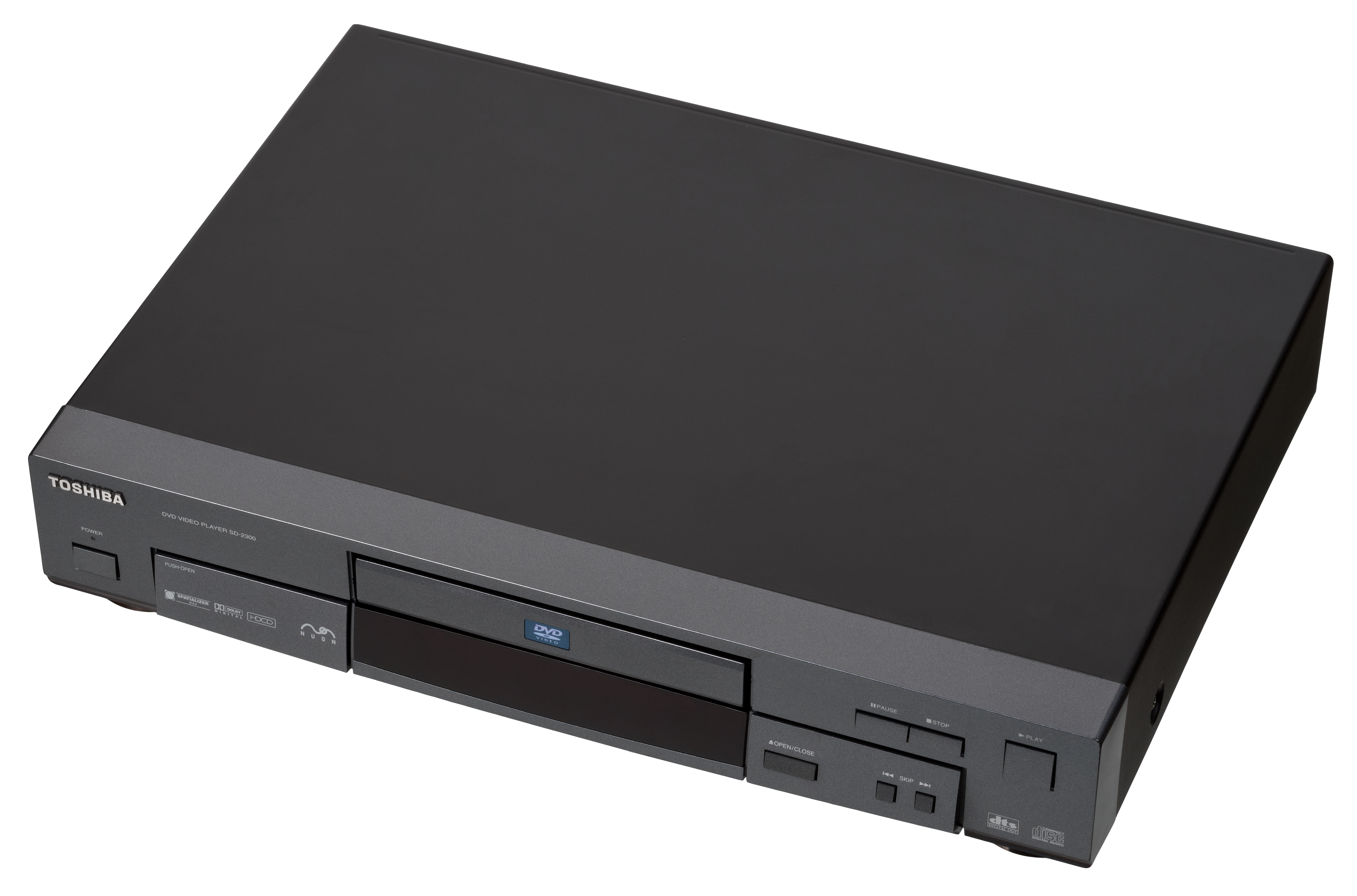
A Nuon DVD player manufactured by Toshiba, which offered enhanced playback and 3D gaming

A DVD player is a machine that plays DVDs produced under both the DVD-Video and DVD-Audio technical standards, two different and incompatible standards. Many DVD players will also play audio CDs. DVD players are connected to a television to watch the DVD content, which could be a movie, a recorded TV show, or other content.

== History ==
The first DVD player is claimed to have been created by the Japanese electronics vendor Toshiba in November 1996, and the first to be released to American customers is claimed to have been by Sony in April 1997.

Some manufacturers originally announced that DVD players would be available as early as the middle of 1996. These predictions were too optimistic. Delivery was initially held up for "political" reasons of copy protection demanded by movie studios, but was later delayed by lack of movie titles. The first players appeared in Japan on November 1, 1996, followed by the United States on March 31, 1997, with distribution limited to only seven major cities for the first six months.

Fujitsu released the first DVD-ROM-equipped computer on November 6 in Great Britain. Toshiba released a DVD-ROM-equipped computer and a DVD-ROM drive in Japan in early 1997 (moved back from December which was moved back from November). DVD-ROM drives from Toshiba, Pioneer, Panasonic, Hitachi, and Sony began appearing in sample quantities as early as January 1997, but none were available before May. The first PC upgrade kits (a combination of DVD-ROM drive and hardware decoder card) became available from Creative Labs, Hi-Val, and Diamond Multimedia in April and May 1997. In 2014, every major PC manufacturer had models that included DVD-ROM drives.

The first DVD-Audio players were released in Japan by Pioneer in late 1999, but they did not play copy-protected discs. Matsushita (under the Panasonic and Technics labels) first released full-fledged players in July 2000 for $700 to $1,200. Sony released the first SACD players in May 1999 for $5,000. Pioneer's first DVD-Audio players released in late 1999 also played SACD.

== Technical details ==
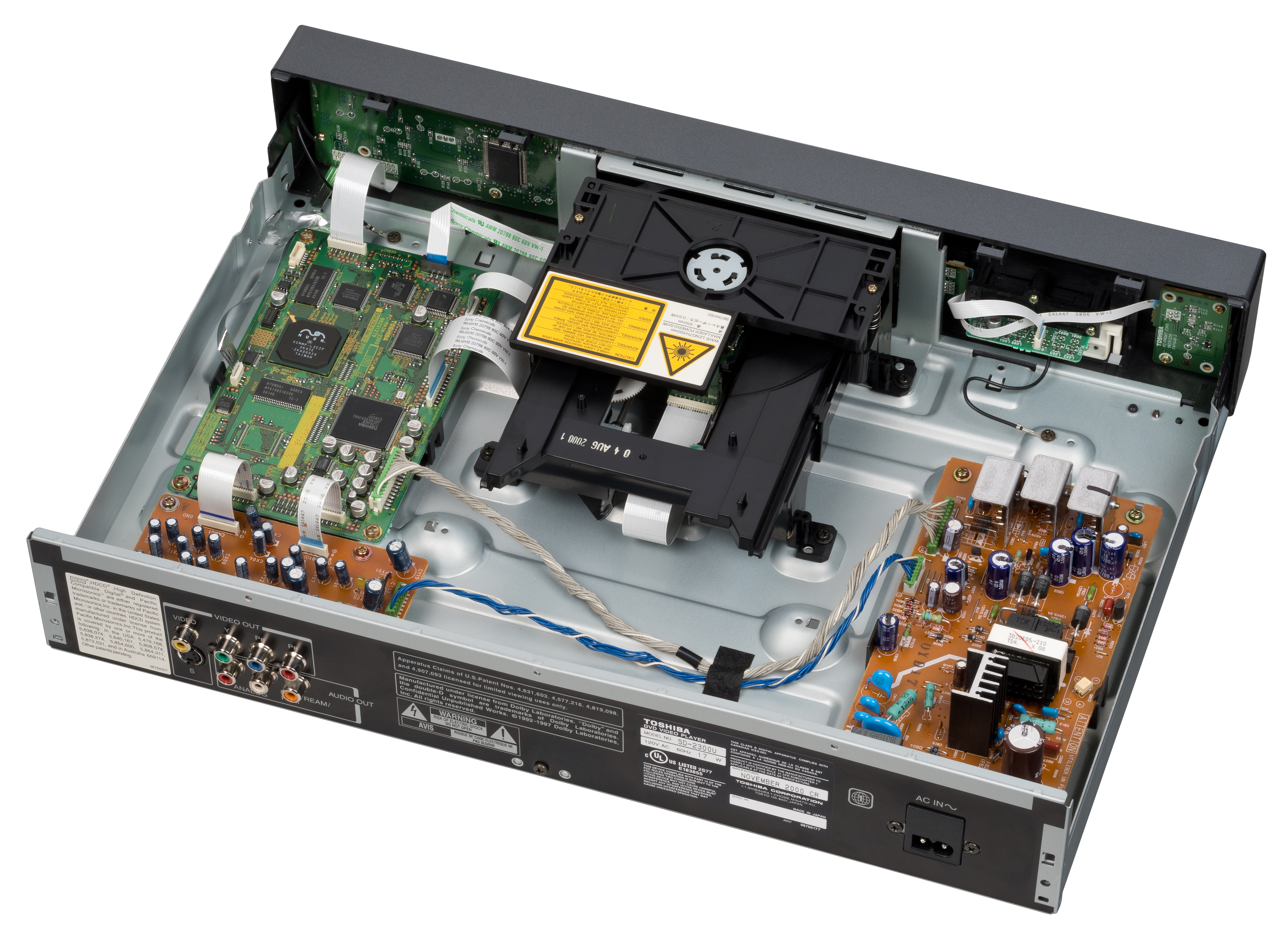
The interior of a DVD player

A DVD player has to be able to read a DVD in ISO – UDF version 1.02 format, and needs to read and obey the DVD region codes and display a warning if the player is not authorized to play the DVD.

To play a DVD smoothly, it needs to be able to decode the MPEG-2 video stream with a maximum bit rate of 10 Mbit/s at peak and 8 Mbit/s continuously.

A DVD player may be able to:

- Optionally decrypt the data with either CSS and/or Macrovision
- Decode sound in MP2, PCM or AC-3 format and output (with optional AC-3 to stereo downmixing) on stereo connector, optical or electric digital connector
- Output a video signal, either an analog one (in NTSC or PAL format) on the composite, S-Video, SCART, or component video connectors, or a digital one on the DVI or HDMI connectors.
- Jump to manually entered titles, chapters, and time stamps.

DVD players cannot play Blu-ray discs due to using different wavelength lasers (Blu-ray discs use a blue-violet laser, hence their name, rather than a red laser). However, Blu-ray players are typically backwards compatible, meaning they will play DVDs. Some are compatible with CD and other disc formats. The short-lived HD DVD format is also incompatible with DVD for the same reason, however, HD DVD players do play standard DVDs and CDs.

DVD players are largely controlled through a remote control. Built-in controls on the main unit's panel such as a four-directional buttons vary depending on model. Some models may lack advanced built-in controls, making operation more dependent on the remote control.

== CD/DVD/AVI/MP4 playback ==
Additionally, most DVD players allow users to play audio CDs (CD-DA, MP3, etc.) and Video CDs (VCD). A few include a home cinema decoder (i.e. Dolby Digital, Digital Theater Systems (DTS)). Some newer devices also play videos in the MPEG-4 ASP video compression format (such as DivX) popular in the Internet.

== Progressive scan DVD player ==
A progressive scan DVD player is a DVD player that can produce video in a progressive scan format such as 480p (NTSC) or 576p (PAL). Players which can output resolutions higher than 480p or 576p are often called upconverting DVD players.

Before HDTVs became common, players were sold which could produce 480p or 576p. TVs with this feature were often in the upper price range of a manufacturer's line. To utilize this feature, a TV or other display with a progressive scan input was needed. HDTVs usually have a progressive scan input; progressive scan inputs are less common on standard definition TVs (often called SDTVs.)

Some players have a feature called "3:2 pulldown detection" or "inverse telecine" which attempts to better handle the artifacts which result from differing film and video rates in conjunction with interlaced scanning of the film. However most line doublers used in these players are not able to achieve the anticipated inverse telecine functionality. (See Line doubler for details.)

Progressive scan output cannot use connections intended for interlaced video, such as composite video (single RCA terminated cable) and S-Video (Mini-DIN terminated cable). The following connection methods are common for using progressive scan:

- VGA (analog)
- SCART (using analog RGB-video in PAL areas)
- Component video (using three cables terminated with RCA connectors)
- DVI or HDMI (Most recent methods, supported by many newer HDTVs)

== Portable players ==
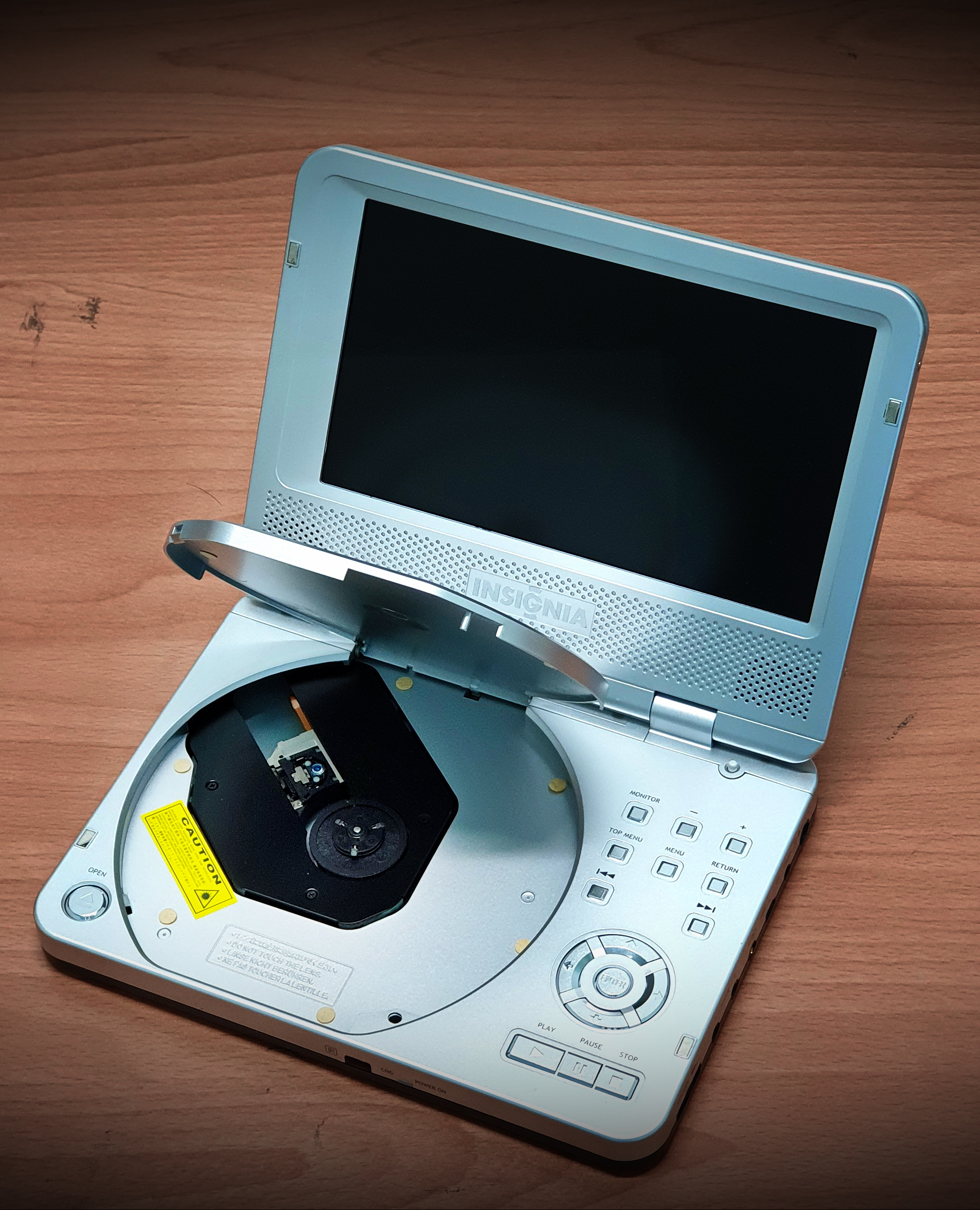
A portable DVD player

Most hardware DVD players must be connected to a television; there are portable players which have an attached LCD screen and stereo speakers. Portable DVD players are often used for long road trips and travel. They often have a plug for the 12 volt power jack in cars. Some models have two screens, so that two people in the back seat can both watch the movie. Other portable DVD players have a single screen that opens up like a laptop computer screen.

== Output ==
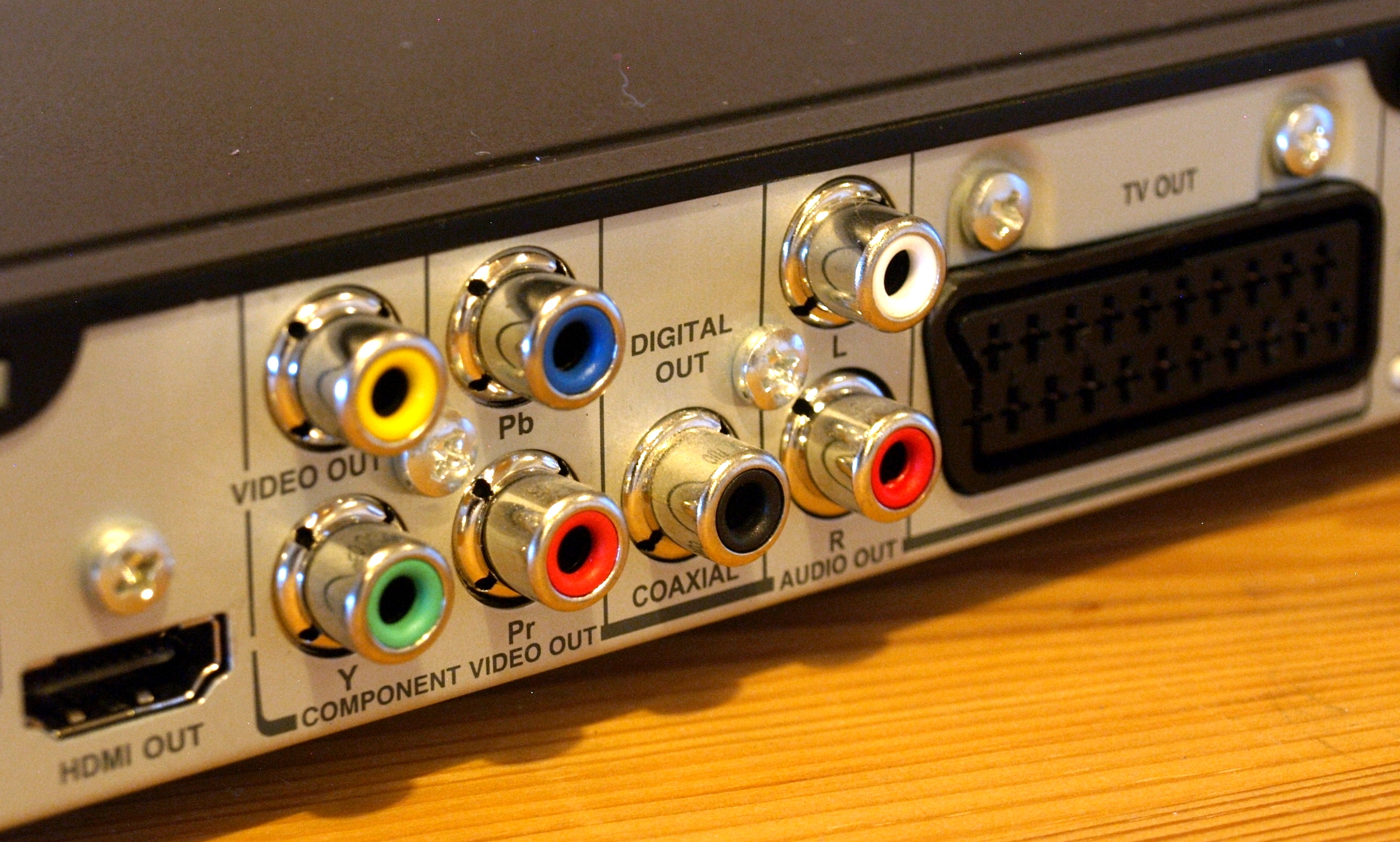
Output connectors of a DVD player (2016): The single HDMI connector on the left is employed to replace the older connection options for audio and video signals, which require at least two, depending on the use case even up to five, individual cable connections with RCA connectors (see middle section, colored). An exception was the technically outdated SCART type A/V connector most right.

Due to multiple audio (and video) output devices, there are many outputs on a DVD player, such as an RCA jack, component outputs, and an HDMI output. Consumers may become confused with how to connect a player to a TV or amplifier. Most systems include an optional digital audio connector for this task, which is then paired with a similar input on the amplifier. The physical connection is typically RCA connectors or TOSLINK, which transmits a S/PDIF stream carrying either uncompressed digital audio (PCM) or the original compressed audio data (Dolby Digital, DTS, MPEG audio) to be decoded by the audio equipment.

=== Video ===
Video is another issue which continues to present the most problems. Early generations of DVD players usually outputted analog video only, via both composite video on an RCA jack and S-Video. However, neither connector was intended to be used for progressive video, and most later players sold then gained another set of connectors, component video, which keeps the three components of the video, luminance and two color differentials, on fully separate wires. This video information is taken directly from the DVD itself. The three components compare well to S-Video, which uses two wires, uniting and degrading the two color signals, and composite, which uses only wire one, uniting and degrading all three signals.

The connectors are further confused by using a number of different physical connectors on different player models, RCA or BNC, as well as using VGA cables in a non-standard way (VGA is normally analog RGB—a different, incompatible form of component video). Even worse, there are often two sets of component outputs, one carrying interlaced video, and the other progressive, or an interlaced/progressive switch (either a physical switch or a menu setting).

In Europe (but not most other PAL areas), SCART connectors are generally used, which can carry composite and analog RGB interlaced video signals (RGB can be progressive, but not all DVD players and displays support this mode) or Y/C (S-Video), as well as analog two-channel sound and automatic 4:3 or 16:9 (widescreen) switching on a single convenient multi-wire cable. The analog RGB component signal offers video quality which is superior to S-Video and identical to YPbPr component video. However, analog RGB and S-Video signals can not be carried simultaneously, due to each using the same pins for different uses, and displays often must be manually configured as to the input signal, since no switching mode exists for S-Video. (A switching mode does exist to indicate whether composite or RGB is being used.) Some DVD players and set-top boxes offer YPbPr component video signals over the wires in the SCART connector intended for RGB, though this violates the official specification and manual configuration is again necessary. (Hypothetically, unlike RGB component, YPbPr component signals and S-Video Y/C signals could both be sent over the wire simultaneously, since they share the luminance (Y) component.)

HDMI is a digital connection for carrying high-definition video, similar to DVI. Along with video, HDMI also supports up to eight-channel digital audio. DVD players with connectors for high-definition video can upconvert the source to formats used for higher definition video (e.g., 720p, 1080i, 1080p, etc.), before outputting the signal. By no means, however, will the resulting signal be high-definition video; that is, aside from optional deinterlacing, upconverting generally consists of merely scaling the video's dimensions to match that of higher resolution formats, forgoing the scaling that would normally occur in the output device.

=== USB ===
Some DVD players include a USB video recorder. As well as such, there are also have DVD players with a USB port to be able to play digital media types as well as MP4, MP3, etc.

=== Wireless ===
Wireless connections (bluetooth and/or Wi-Fi) are useful to manage (play/record) wirelessly content from or to other devices (i.e. cell phones).

== Prices ==
As of 2014, retail prices for such a device, depending on its optional features (such as digital sound or video output), start between 30 and 80 USD/Euro. They are usually cheaper than VCRs.

== Manufacture ==
As of 2002 the largest producer of DVD players is China; in 2002 they produced 30 million players, more than 70% of the world output. These producers have to pay US$15–$20 per player in license fees, to the patent holders of the DVD technology (Sony, Philips, Toshiba) as well as for MPEG-2 licenses. To avoid these fees, China developed the Enhanced Versatile Disc standard as an intended successor of DVD; as of 2004, EVD players were only being sold in China.

== Software ==
Software DVD players are programs that allow users to view DVD videos on a computer with a DVD-ROM drive. Some examples are PowerDVD, VLC media player, Windows DVD Player, and DVD Player on Mac.

Among others, there are variants & huge kinds of software DVD players as well as multimedia player software which has DVD video playback capability, whether its proprietary-type (as commercial software), freeware, shareware or just a free software are available in the market.

== Successors ==
In the battle to succeed and to improve upon the role of the DVD player as the mainstream medium for stored audiovisual content on optical disc, there were two major contestants: the HD DVD player and the Blu-ray player, utilizing two incompatible technologies that reproduced higher resolution video images and more complete audio information than was possible with DVD. On February 19, 2008, Toshiba, creator of the former technology, announced it would cease production on all HD DVD products, leaving Blu-ray as the high definition successor to DVD players.

As technology improved, various players were sold, some of which were also Blu-ray players, that could upscale and up-convert DVD content, increasing the overall perceived picture quality.

== See also ==
- CD-ROM
- Digital media player
- Digital video recorder
- DVD-Audio
- Film recorder
- Videocassette recorder
- Compact Disc and DVD copy protection
