= 576p =

Shorthand name for a video display resolution

576p is the shorthand name for a video display resolution. The p stands for progressive scan, i.e. non-interlaced, the 576 for a vertical resolution of 576 pixels (the frame rate can be given explicitly after the letter). Usually it corresponds to a digital video mode with a 4:3 anamorphic resolution of 720 x 576 and a frame rate of 25 frames per second (576p25), and thus using the same bandwidth and carrying the same amount of pixel data as 576i, but other resolutions and frame rates are possible.

ITU-R Recommendation BT.1358 allows the following resolutions, coded as R'G'B' or YC_{B}C_{R}, with timings compatible with BT.656:

- 1024 x 576p (16:9 square pixel format)
- 960 x 576p
- 936 x 576p (based on 960 x 576p, blanking the first and last 12 pixels of each line)
- 864 x 576p
- 768 x 576p (4:3 square pixel format)
- 720 x 576p (4:3 anamorphic)
- 704 x 576p (based on 720 x 576p, blanking the first and last 8 pixels of each line)
- 640 x 576p
- 576 x 576p
- 544 x 576p
- 480 x 576p

576p is considered standard definition for PAL regions. It can be transported by both major digital television formats (ATSC and DVB) and on DVD-Video (if limited to 25 fps). It is defined as a valid enhanced-definition television resolution in the SMPTE standard 344M. SMPTE 344M defines a 576p50 standard with twice the data rate of BT.601, using 704 × 576 active pixels with 16 × 576 horizontal blanking pixels.

== PAL ==
This resolution can be also named as PAL, for example in the context home video or gaming consoles, because of its relation with the analog color system using a similar number of scanlines. but 576p can be used to generate both PAL or SECAM interlaced analog signals (where both interlaced fields correspond to a unique frame).

== 576p50 ==
With doubled temporal resolution, 576p50 is considered enhanced-definition television (EDTV), regardless of the image being scaled the same way as an interlaced frame. In some countries, such as Australia, the 576p resolution standard is technically considered high-definition and was in use by the Special Broadcasting Service (SBS TV), eventually replaced by 720p for its high-definition subchannel; SBS later changed to using 1080i. The Seven Network initially used 576p for its high-definition subchannel, but now uses 1080i instead.

The frames are doubled (from a 25 frame source) on broadcast (to avoid flicker) for display devices that lack any kind of frame doubling ability. Widescreen 16:9 material has only the width scaled down to fit 720 pixels instead of an unscaled 1024 width.

== See also ==
- Enhanced-definition television (EDTV)
- List of common display resolutions
- 4320p, 2160p, 1080p, 1080i, 720p, 576i, 480p, 480i, 360p, 288p, 240p
- WSVGA, the associated computer display resolution
