= HDcctv =

High Definition closed circuit TV system

- High Definition Closed Circuit Television
- Organization: HDcctv Alliance

HDcctv (High Definition Closed Circuit Television) is an open industrial standard for transmitting uncompressed high-definition analog (AHD) or digital video over point-to-point coaxial cable links for video surveillance applications. HDcctv uses the SMPTE HD-SDI protocol and can transmit 720p or 1080p video over at least 100 m of RG59 cable.

The HDcctv Alliance is a non-profit, global consortium that develops and promotes the HDcctv standard. Advantages over IP video surveillance are claimed to include low latency and zero configuration.

Devices incorporating HDcctv interfaces include video cameras, DVRs and repeaters.

== Cabling ==
One of the main advantages of HDcctv is that it does not require significant modification for existing CCTV systems designed for analog cameras originally using composite NTSC or PAL video, for which extensive cabling and labor was invested for installation of the original analog system.

Since the coaxial cables originally used for the analog system have significant unused data spectrum available, it is a simple matter to just replace the camera and the recorder to obtain nearly seven times higher detail (1920x1080 vs 640x480) than the original camera system. Since coaxial cable is capable of carrying a hundred HDTV channels simultaneously, there is still more unused data capacity available for future resolution improvements.
