= 576i =

Standard-definition video mode

SDTV resolution by nation: countries using 576i are in blue.

576i is a standard-definition digital video mode, originally used for digitizing 625-line analogue television that had been used in most countries where the utility frequency for electric power distribution is 50 Hz. Because of its close association with the legacy colour encoding systems, it is often referred to as PAL, SECAM or PAL/SECAM, when compared to its counterpart, 480i, commonly called NTSC after the system typically used in countries with 60 Hz utility frequency (see also PAL-M).

The 576 identifies a vertical resolution of 576 lines, and the i identifies it as an interlaced resolution. The field rate, which is 50 Hz, is sometimes included when identifying the video mode, i.e. 576i50; another notation, endorsed by both the International Telecommunication Union in BT.601 and SMPTE in SMPTE 259M, includes the frame rate, as in 576i/25.

== Operation ==
Interlaced scanning: display of odd (green) and even (red) scanlines, and line return blanking periods (dotted)

In analogue television, the full raster uses 625 lines, with 49 lines having no image content to allow time for cathode ray tube circuits to retrace for the next frame (see Vertical blanking interval). These non-displayed lines can be used to transmit teletext or other services. In the digital domain, only the visible 576 lines are considered.

Analogue television signals have no pixels; they are continuous along rastered scan lines, but limited by the available bandwidth. The maximal baseband bandwidth is around 6 MHz which, according to the sampling theorem, translates to about 720 pixels. This value is enough to capture all the original information present. In digital applications, the number of pixels per line is an arbitrary choice. Values above about 500 pixels per line are enough for a perceived quality equivalent to analogue free-to-air television; DVB-T, DVD and DV allow better values such as 704 or 720 (matching the maximum theoretical resolution of the original analogue system).

Colour information is stored using the YCbCr colour space (regardless of the original PAL or SECAM colour system) with 4:2:2 sampling and following Rec. 601 colourimetry.

== Usage ==
Originally used for conversion of analogue sources in TV studios, this resolution was adopted into digital broadcasting or home use. In digital video applications, such as DVDs and digital broadcasting, colour encoding is no longer significant; in that context, 576i means only

- 576 frame lines
- 25 frames or 50 fields per second
- Interlaced video
- PCM audio (baseband)

The 576i video format can be transported by major digital television formats, ATSC, DVB and ISDB, and on DVD, and it supports aspect ratios of standard 4:3 and anamorphic 16:9.

== Progressive sources ==
When 576i is used to transmit content that was originally composed of 25 full progressive frames per second (576p25 or 576p/25), the odd field of the frame is transmitted first (this is the opposite to 480i). Systems which recover progressive frames or transcode video should ensure that this field order is obeyed, otherwise the recovered frame will consist of a field from one frame and a field from an adjacent frame, resulting in 'comb' interlacing artifacts. Such progressive content can be marked using encoding flags, for example in DVDs or other MPEG2 based media.

== PAL speed-up ==
Motion pictures shot on film are typically intended to be played back at 24 frames per second. When telecined and played back at the PAL standard 25 frames per second, films run 4.16̅% faster than the original, and 4.27083̅% faster than the NTSC film standard (Note: For NTSC playback, 24 fps sources are generally slowed down to 23.9̅7̅6̅0̅2̅3̅9̅7̅6̅ fps, to be able to fit into a 29.9̅7̅0̅0̅2̅9̅9̅7̅ fps timebase with a 3:2 pulldown.) 23.9̅7̅6̅0̅2̅3̅9̅7̅6̅ frames per second. This increase in speed also increases the pitch of the audio by a little less than 71 cents. Digital conversion methods can correct for this increased speed and play the video back at its correct speed and pitch, at the expense of a decreased audio sample rate. (Note: This method reduces the typical DVD sample rate of 48000 Hz to 46080 Hz.)

Some movie enthusiasts may prefer PAL over NTSC despite this increased speed, because the latter results in stutter, a visual distortion not present in sped-up PAL video, where different frames last for uneven amounts of time. This is generally not an issue on modern upconverting DVD players and personal computers, as they play back 23.9̅7̅6̅0̅2̅3̅9̅7̅6̅ fps video at its native frame rate.

Another method of converting 24 fps footage to 25 fps is the Euro pulldown, where every frame of the original footage is distributed into two fields, except every 12th frame which lasts for three fields. This preserves the pitch and sample rate of the audio, and the higher resolution of PAL video compared to NTSC, at the expense of more stuttery motion.

Yet another method is frame blending, which preserves smooth motion but leaves ghosting artifacts, although it has been criticized by some as looking amateurish.

PAL speed-up does not occur on footage intended for playback at 25 frames per second.

== See also ==
- List of common display resolutions
- 4320p, 2160p, 1080p, 1080i, 720p, 576p, 480p, 480i, 360p, 240p
- Standard-definition television
- 405-line television system
