= 1920×1080 =

1920 × 1080 may mean:

- An HDTV resolution
  - 1080p (1920 × 1080p, 16:9 aspect ratio, using progressive scan)
  - 1080i (1920 × 1080i, 16:9 aspect ratio, using interlaced scan)
