= Error Detection and Handling =

In television technology, Error Detection and Handling (EDH) protocol is an optional but commonly used addition to the Standard Definition-Serial Digital Interface (SDI) standard. This protocol allows an SD-SDI receiver to verify that each field of video is received correctly.

The SD-SDI transmitter calculates two CRC values for each video field—one corresponding to the active picture, and corresponding to the entire field (excluding the switching lines)--and places them in an EDH ancillary data packet. The EDH packet is inserted at a specific location in each field of video. The SD-SDI receiver also generates the same two CRC values for each field and compares them against the CRC values in the received EDH packet to determine if each field of video is received without errors. The EDH packet also contains bits to signal that a prior link in a broadcast or transmission chain contained an error; equipment which receives a video signal with an incorrect CRC, and retransmits the signal, is expected to re-insert the correct CRC (which may be different if the equipment alters the video signal in any way) and set the flag indicating a prior error. This feature makes it easier to determine which link, in a multi-link chain, was the source of the error.

The EDH protocol does not provide for error correction, only error detection. Also, there is no mechanism in SD-SDI to allow a field containing errors to be retransmitted. EDH is used primarily to assist in identifying faulty equipment in a video chain so that it can be quickly replaced or repaired.

EDH is not used with high definition video, as the HD serial digital interface includes a mandatory embedded CRC for each line.

The SD-SDI EDH protocol is defined by SMPTE RP 165-1994 and the equivalent ITU standard ITU-R BT.1304

== See also ==
- error detection and correction
