= VPID =

VPID may refer to:

== Computing ==
- Vendor Product ID, in the SCSI context
- Video Payload Identifier, in the serial digital interface (SDI) context
- Virtual Process ID, a process ID (PID) within a Linux PID namespace
- Virtual Processor ID, in the Kernel-based Virtual Machine (KVM) context
