= UDW (disambiguation) =

UDW most commonly refers to University of Durban-Westville, a former university in South Africa

UDW may also refer to

- User data words, the "payload" of the ancillary data packet in the context of television
- Independent Drolshagen Voters' Association (German: Unabhängige Drolshagener Wählergemeinschaft), a political grouping on Drolshagen Town Council.
- Uduwara railway station, on the Main Line (Sri Lanka) (station code: UDW)
