= RSS TV =

Navigation protocol for Internet media services

RSS-TV is an XML-based navigation protocol for Internet media services based on the RSS standard.

The adoption of RSS-TV enables video device manufacturers to develop applications to navigate Internet media services. Example video devices include set top boxes, game consoles, broadband-connected digital video disc (DVD) players, digital video recorders (DVRs), personal video recorders (PVRs) and next-generation mobile phones. By implementing the RSS TV protocol, these devices provide user access to a growing library of online media (video, audio and games) services.

RSS-TV is an extension of RSS and includes additional XML elements and attributes to enable Premium TV-centric features such as:

- Video on demand (VOD) and Subscription video on demand (SVOD)
- Navigating media services (video, audio, games) in a hierarchical fashion
- Capturing user input (such as a user personal identification number (PIN), search query, or email) and automatic search suggestions.
- Network PVR functionality
- Secure download of HD content
- Electronic program guide for live streams
- Automatic language selection
- Numeric shortcuts for selecting menu items

Readers familiar with Digital Video Broadcasting (DVB) can compare RSS-TV with the DVB Service Information standards developed in the 1990s for digital TV EPGs. The difference is that RSS-TV has been developed for two-way Internet Protocol (IP) networks rather than broadcasting networks. RSS-TV leverages the increasing availability of products that support RSS such as caching engines and RSS-enabled content management and publishing systems.

RSS-TV compliant applications can be implemented using any language and operating system including AJAX/HTML, Flash, OpenTV, or C. Similarly, service providers can use any web service technologies (Java, .NET, PHP) to build RSS-TV compliant services.

== Podcasting ==
RSS-compliant feeds that use enclosures for video/audio (podcasting) are fully compliant with RSS-TV. RSS-TV compliant clients will display these feeds as a list of menu items and will play (or download) the media.

== Encoding ==
Similar to other XML-based standards, RSS-TV documents are assumed to be 8-bit Unicode Transformation Format (UTF-8) encoded.

== See also ==
- Media RSS
