= SMPTE 274M =

SMPTE standard for high definition video formats

SMPTE 274M is a standard published by SMPTE which defines the 1080 line high definition video formats including 1080p25 and 1080p30. It is frequently carried on serial digital interface physical cables defined by the SMPTE 292M standard.

== See also ==
- SMPTE 296M
