= SMPTE ST 296 =

SMPTE standard for high definition video formats

SMPTE ST 296 is a standard published by SMPTE which defines the 720 line high definition video formats including 720p50 and 720p60. It is frequently carried on serial digital interface physical cables defined by the SMPTE 292M standard.

The standard is also known as SMPTE 296M, but was renamed following a policy change by SMPTE dropping the M (which originally referred to metric).

== See also ==
- SMPTE 274M
