= SMPTE 372M =

Dual-link serial digital interface standard

SMPTE 372M is a standard published by SMPTE which expands upon SMPTE 259M, SMPTE 344M, and SMPTE 292M allowing for bit-rates of 2.970 Gbit/s, and 2.970/1.001 Gbit/s over two wires. These bit-rates are sufficient for 1080p video at 50 or 60 frames per second.

This standard is informally known as dual-link HD-SDI and is part of a family of standards that define a serial digital interface.
