= SMPTE 344M =

Serial digital interface for video transport

SMPTE 344M is a standard published by SMPTE which expands upon SMPTE 259M allowing for serial digital interface bit-rates of 540 Mbit/s, allowing EDTV resolutions of 480p and 576p.

This standard is part of a family of standards that define a serial digital interface.
