= Enhanced-definition television =

Consumer Electronics Association marketing shorthand term

Enhanced-definition television, or extended-definition television (EDTV; also known as enhanced-definition, extended-definition or ED) is a Consumer Electronics Association (CEA) marketing shorthand term for certain digital television (DTV) formats and devices. Specifically, this term defines an extension of the standard-definition television (SDTV) format that enables a clearer picture during high-motion scenes compared to previous iterations of SDTV, but not producing images as detailed as high-definition television (HDTV).

The term refers to devices capable of displaying 480-line or 576-line signals in progressive scan, commonly referred to as 480p (NTSC-HQ) and 576p (PAL-HQ/SECAM) respectively, as opposed to interlaced scanning, commonly referred to as 480i (NTSC) or 576i (PAL, SECAM). High-motion is optional for EDTV.

In Australia, the 576p resolution standard was used by the Special Broadcasting Service (SBS TV) and Seven Network, being technically considered high-definition.

In Japan, the term is associated with improvements to analog NTSC called EDTV-I (or "Clear-vision") and EDTV-II (or "Wide-aspect Clear-vision") including ghost cancellation, digital sound or widescreen broadcasts, using a methods vaguely similar to PALplus.

In Europe, it can be applied to analog PALplus or MAC broadcasts. In other countries definitions may vary.

== Connectivity ==
As EDTV signals require more bandwidth (due to frame doubling) than is feasible with SDTV connection standards (such as composite video, SCART or S-Video), higher bandwidth media must be used to accommodate the additional data transfer. To achieve EDTV, consumer electronic devices such as a progressive scan DVD player or modern video game consoles must be connected through at least a component video cable (typically using 3 RCA cables for video), a VGA connector, or a DVI or HDMI connector. For over-the-air television broadcasts, EDTV content uses the same connectors as HDTV.

== Broadcast and displays ==
EDTV broadcasts use less digital bandwidth than HDTV, so TV stations can broadcast several EDTV stations at once. Like SDTV, EDTV signals are broadcast with non-square pixels. Since the same number of horizontal pixels are used in 4:3 and 16:9 broadcasts, the 16:9 mode is sometimes referred to as anamorphic widescreen. Most EDTV displays use square pixels, yielding a resolution of 852 × 480. However, since no broadcasts use this pixel count, such displays always scale anything they show. The only sources of 852 × 480 video are Internet downloads, such as some video games. Unlike 1080i and SDTV formats, progressive displays (such as plasma displays and LCDs) can show EDTV signals without the need to de-interlace them first. This can result in a reduction of motion artifacts. However to achieve this most progressive displays require the broadcast to be frame doubled (i.e., 25 to 50 and 30 to 60) to avoid the same motion flicker issues that interlacing fixes.

== Home media ==
The progressive output of a DVD player can be considered the baseline for EDTV. Movies shot at 24 frames-per-second (fps) are often encoded onto a DVD at 24 fps progressive. For telecine sources, most DVD players can do the 2:2 or 3:2 pulldown conversion dealing with deinterlacing internally, before feeding the output to a progressive 576p or 480p display.

Blu-ray Discs can encode all EDTV forms, but because HDTV is a primary selling point of Blu-ray, this is only used for certain bonus content such as featurettes, deleted scenes, interviews and behind the scenes documentaries on the making of the film.

== Gaming ==
The video resolution of video game consoles reached EDTV specifications starting with the Sega Dreamcast, becoming the first mainstream console with a VGA output, supporting EDTV. The PlayStation 2, GameCube, original Xbox and Wii are also EDTV compatible with a component connection. The Xbox 360 can output 480p via YP_{B}P_{R} component, VGA and HDMI (newer models only) cables. The PlayStation 3 outputs EDTV via its HDMI and component video (YP_{B}P_{R}) connections; 480p is only available on NTSC consoles while 576p is only available on PAL consoles.

Despite 576p being a valid output from the PS2's component out, it is never used by any games released in PAL territories; instead the few games retaining progressive scan mode in their PAL localizations output in 480p. There are homebrew solutions available to force the output to progressive scan mode (which also in turn allows 60 Hz modes for 720p and 1080p: neither of which were otherwise used in any capacity officially).
