= 1080p =

Video mode

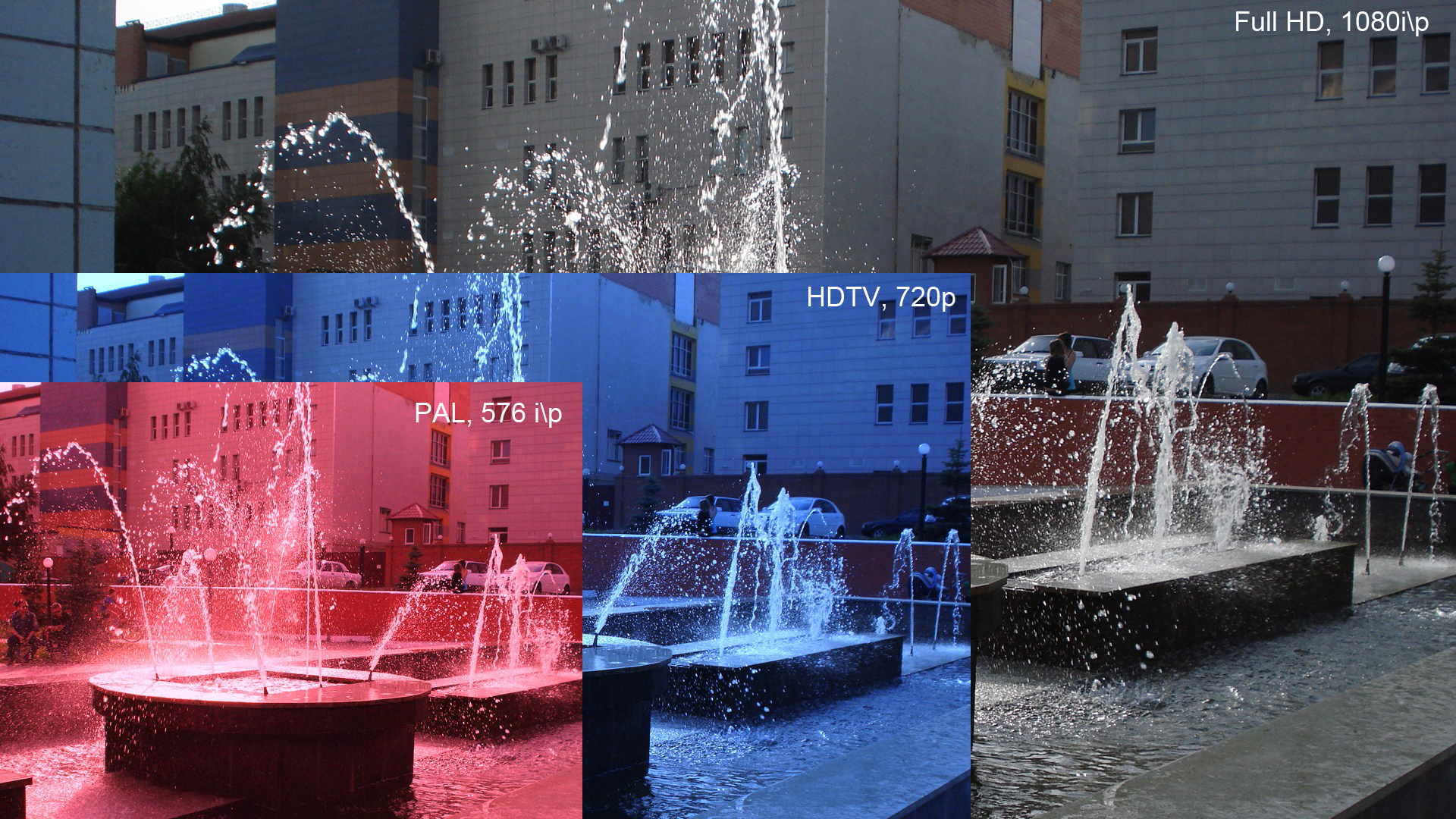
TV standards through 1080p. The red-tinted image shows 576i or 576p resolution. The blue-tinted image shows 720p resolution, an HDTV level of resolution. The full-color image shows 1080 resolution.

1080p (1920 × 1080 progressively displayed pixels; also known as Full HD or FHD, and BT.709) is a set of HDTV high-definition video modes characterized by 1,920 pixels displayed across the screen horizontally and 1,080 pixels down the screen vertically; the p stands for progressive scan, i.e. non-interlaced. The term usually assumes a widescreen aspect ratio of 16:9, implying a resolution of 2.1 megapixels. It is often marketed as Full HD or FHD, to contrast 1080p with 720p resolution screens. Although 1080p is sometimes referred to as 2K resolution (meaning having a horizontal resolution of approximately 2,000 pixels), other sources differentiate between 1080p and (true) 2K resolution.

1080p video signals are supported by ATSC standards in the United States and DVB standards in Europe. Applications of the 1080p standard include television broadcasts, Blu-ray Discs, smartphones, Internet content such as YouTube videos and Netflix TV shows and movies, consumer-grade televisions and projectors, computer monitors and video game consoles. Small camcorders, smartphones and digital cameras can capture still and moving images in 1080p resolution.

== Broadcasting standards ==
Any display device that advertises 1080p typically refers to the ability to accept a 1080p signal and display it with a native resolution of at least 1080 lines vertically (as well as the ability to upscale lower-resolution material to 1080p). This means that the display is not over-scanning, under-scanning, or reinterpreting the signal to a lower resolution. The HD ready 1080p logo program, by DigitalEurope, requires that certified TV sets support 1080p 24 fps, 1080p 25 fps, 1080p 50 fps, and 1080p 60 fps formats, among other requirements, with fps meaning frames per second. For live broadcast applications, a high-definition progressive scan format operating at 1080p at 50 or 60 frames per second was being evaluated as a future standard for moving picture acquisition, although 24 fps was used for shooting movies. Until the early 2010s, EBU was endorsing 1080p50 as a future-proof production format because it improved resolution and required no deinterlacing, allowed broadcasting of standard 1080i50 and 720p50 signal alongside 1080p50 even in the current infrastructure and was compatible with DCI distribution formats.

1080p50/p60 production format requires a whole new range of studio equipment including cameras, storage and editing systems, and contribution links (such as Dual-link HD-SDI and 3G-SDI) as it has doubled the data rate of current 50 or 60 fields interlaced 1920 × 1080 from 1.485 Gbit/s to nominally 3 Gbit/s using uncompressed RGB encoding. Most current revisions of SMPTE 372M, SMPTE 424M and EBU Tech 3299 require YCbCr color space and 4:2:2 chroma subsampling for transmitting 1080p50 (nominally 2.08 Gbit/s) and 1080p60 signal. Studies from 2009 show that for digital broadcasts compressed with H.264/AVC, transmission bandwidth savings of interlaced video over fully progressive video are minimal even when using twice the frame rate; i.e., 1080p50 signal (50 progressive frames per second) actually produces the same bit rate as 1080i50 signal (25 interlaced frames or 50 sub-fields per second).

=== ATSC ===
In the United States, the original ATSC standards for HDTV supported 1080p video, but only at the frame rates of 23.976, 24, 25, 29.97 and 30 frames per second (colloquially known as 1080p24, 1080p25 and 1080p30). In July 2008, the ATSC standards were amended to include H.264/MPEG-4 AVC compression and 1080p at 50, 59.94 and 60 frames per second (1080p50 and 1080p60). Such frame rates require H.264/AVC High Profile Level 4.2, while standard HDTV frame rates only require Level 4.0. This update is not expected to result in widespread availability of 1080p60 programming, since most of the existing digital receivers in use would only be able to decode the older, less-efficient MPEG-2 codec, and because there is a limited amount of bandwidth for subchannels.

=== DVB ===
In Europe, 1080p25 signals have been supported by the DVB suite of broadcasting standards. The 1080p50 format is considered to be a future-proof production format and, eventually, a future broadcasting format. 1080p50 broadcasting should require the same bandwidth as 1080i50 signal and only 15–20% more than that of 720p50 signal due to increased compression efficiency, though 1080p50 production requires more bandwidth or more efficient codecs such as JPEG 2000, high-bitrate MPEG-2, or H.264/AVC and HEVC. In September 2009, ETSI and EBU, the maintainers of the DVB suite, added support for 1080p50 signal coded with MPEG-4 AVC High Profile Level 4.2 with Scalable Video Coding extensions or VC-1 Advanced Profile compression; DVB also supports 1080p encoded at ATSC frame rates of 23.976, 24, 29.97, 30, 59.94 and 60.

EBU requires that legacy MPEG-4 AVC decoders should avoid crashing in the presence of SVC or 1080p50 (and higher resolution) packets. SVC enables forward compatibility with 1080p50 and 1080p60 broadcasting for older MPEG-4 AVC receivers, so they will only recognize baseline SVC stream coded at a lower resolution or frame rate (such as 720p60 or 1080i60) and will gracefully ignore additional packets, while newer hardware will be able to decode full-resolution signal (such as 1080p60).

In June 2016, EBU announced the "Advanced 1080p" format which will include UHD Phase A features such as high-dynamic-range video (using PQ and HLG) at 10 and 12 bit color and BT.2020 color gamut, and optional HFR 100, 120/1.001 and 120 Hz; an advanced 1080p video stream can be encoded alongside baseline HDTV or UHDTV signal using Scalable HEVC. The ITU-T BT.2100 standard that includes Advanced 1080p video was subsequently published in July 2016.

== Resolutions ==
In practice, 1080p typically refers to a 1920 × 1080p raster with a 16:9 picture aspect ratio. The following is a list of other resolutions with a picture height of 1080 lines that are sometimes referred as 1080p.

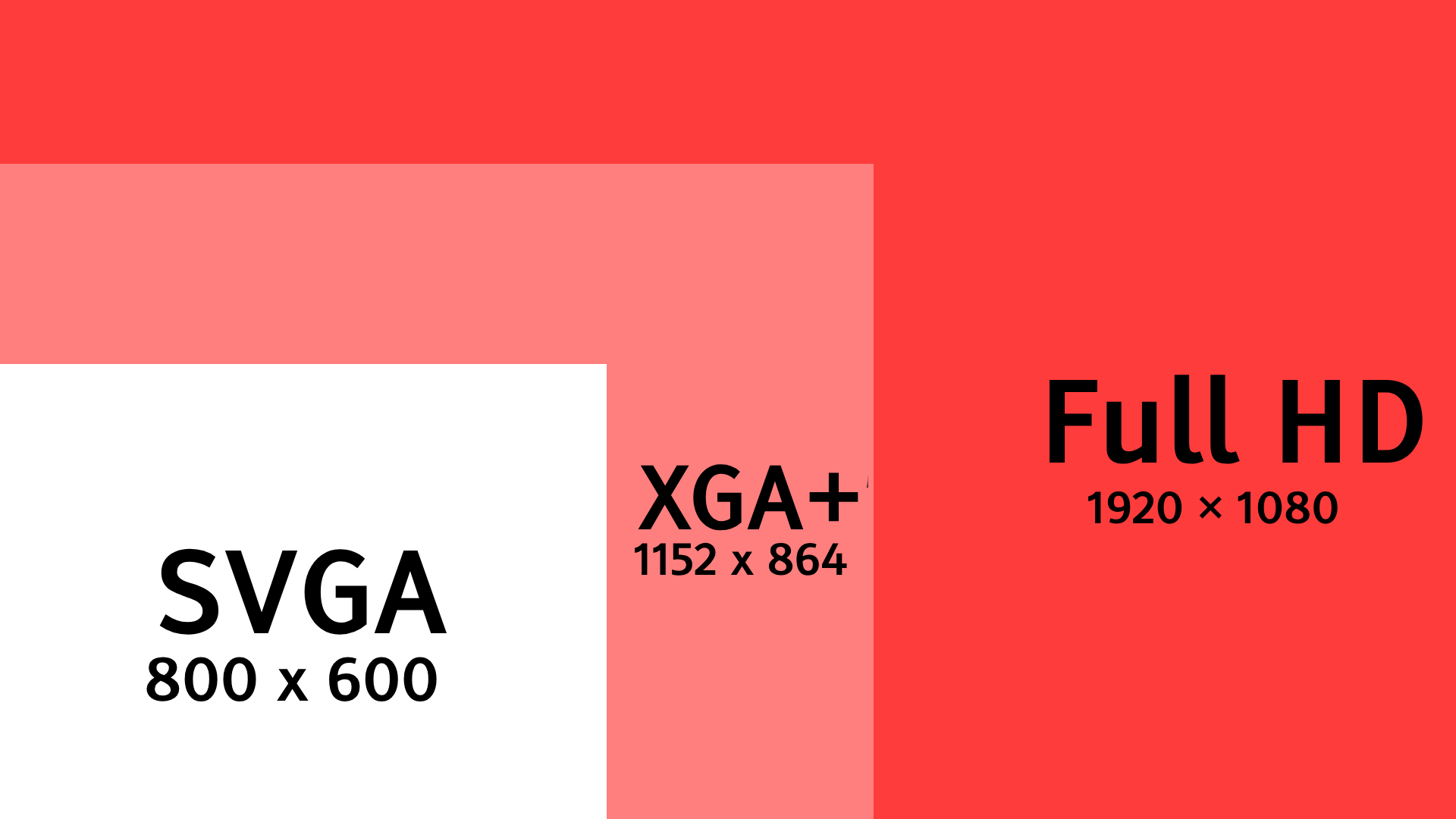
A comparison of SVGA, XGA+ and Full HD

Standard	Resolution	Picture aspect ratio
HDV 1080i	1440 × 1080p	4:3
3:2 wide	1620 × 1080p	3:2
16:10 wide	1728 × 1080p	16:10
5:3 widescreen	1800 × 1080p	5:3
Full HD	1920 × 1080p	16:9
Full HD+	2160 × 1080p	18:9
DCI 2K	2048 × 1080p	1.90:1 (256:135, ≈17:9)
Smartphone display	2220 × 1080p	18.5:9
Smartphone 19:9 display	2280 × 1080p	19:9
Smartphone display	2340 × 1080p	19.5:9
Smartphone 20:9 display	2400 × 1080p	20:9
Ultrawide	2560 × 1080p	≈ 21:9
Vertical	1080 × 1920p	9:16

== Availability ==
This chart shows the most common display resolutions, 16:9 formats shown in blue.

=== Broadcasts ===
In the United States, 1080p over-the-air broadcasts are currently available in select stations in some cities in the US via ATSC 3.0 multiplex stations where as ATSC 3.0 is currently rolling out throughout the U.S. The majority of the stations that broadcast at 1080p are CBS and NBC stations and affiliates. All other stations do not broadcast at 1080p and usually broadcast at 720p60 (including when simulcasting in ATSC 3.0) or 1080i60 (outside of ATSC 3.0) encoded with MPEG-2. There is also technical restrictions with ATSC 3.0 multiplex stations that prevent stations from airing at 1080p. While converting to ATSC 3.0 is voluntary by TV Stations, there is no word when any of the major networks will consider airing at 1080p in the foreseeable future on a national scale, although they are required to broadcast ATSC signals for at least five years thereafter. However, satellite services (e.g., DirecTV, XstreamHD and Dish Network) use the 1080p/24-30 format with MPEG-4 AVC/H.264 encoding for pay-per-view movies that are downloaded in advance via satellite or on-demand via broadband. At this time, no pay service channel such as USA, HDNET, etc. nor premium movie channel such as HBO, etc., stream their services live to their distributors (MVPD) in this format because many MVPDs, especially DBS and cable, do not have sufficient bandwidth to provide the format streaming live to their subscribers without negatively impacting their current services.

For material that originates from a progressive scanned 24 frame/s source (such as film), MPEG-2 lets the video be coded as 1080p24, irrespective of the final output format. These progressively-coded frames are tagged with metadata (literally, fields of the PICTURE header) instructing a decoder how to perform a 3:2 pulldown to interlace them. While the formal output of the MPEG-2 decoding process from such stations is 1080i60, the actual content is coded as 1080p24 and can be viewed as such (using a process known as inverse telecine) since no information is lost even when the broadcaster performs the 3:2 pulldown.

In June 2016, German television stations began broadcasting 1080p50 high-definition video on eight channels via the HEVC-encoded DVB-T2 protocol. A total of 40 channels were available on March 29, 2017 (Phase 1). Further changes took place on November 8, 2017 (Phase 2a), April 25, 2018 (Phase 2b), September 26, 2018 (Phase 3a-I), October 24, 2018 (Phase 3a-II), November 8, 2018 (Phase 3a-III), November 28, 2018 (Phase 3a-IV), December 5, 2018 (Phase 3a-V), March 13, 2019 (Phase 3b-I), April 3, 2019 (Phase 3b-II), May 22, 2019 (Phase 3b-III) and August 29, 2019 (Phase 3b-IV).

=== Blu-ray Disc ===
Blu-ray Discs are able to hold 1080p HD content, and most movies released on Blu-ray Disc produce a full 1080p HD picture when the player is connected to a 1080p HDTV via an HDMI cable. The Blu-ray Disc video specification allows encoding of 1080p23.976, 1080p24, 1080i50, and 1080i59.94. Generally this type of video runs at 30 to 40 megabits per second, compared to the 3.5 megabits per second for conventional standard definition broadcasts.

=== Smartphones ===
Smartphones with 1080p Full HD display have been available on the market since 2012. As of 2014, it is the standard for mid-range to high-end smartphones, with many flagship devices using even higher resolutions, such as Quad HD (1440p) or Ultra HD (2160p).

=== Internet content ===
Several websites, including YouTube, allow videos to be uploaded in the 1080p format. YouTube streams 1080p content at approximately 4 megabits per second compared to Blu-ray's 30 to 40 megabits per second. Digital distribution services like Hulu and HBO Max also deliver 1080p content, such as movies available on Blu-ray Disc or from broadcast sources. This can include distribution services like peer-to-peer websites and public or private tracking networks. Netflix has been offering high quality 1080p content in the US and other countries through select internet providers since 2013.

=== Consumer televisions and projectors ===
Full HD 1080 logo as used by Sony

As of 2012, most consumer televisions being sold provide 1080p inputs, mainly via HDMI, and support full high-definition resolutions. 1080p resolution is available in all types of television, including plasma, LCD, DLP front and rear projection and LCD projection. For displaying film-based 1080i60 signals, a scheme called 3:2 pulldown reversal (reverse telecine) is beginning to appear in some newer 1080p displays, which can produce a true 1080p quality image from film-based 1080i60 programs. Similarly, 25fps content broadcast at 1080i50 may be deinterlaced to 1080p content with no loss of quality or resolution.

AV equipment manufacturers have adopted the term Full HD to mean a set can display all available HD resolutions up to 1080p. The term is misleading, however, because it does not guarantee the set is capable of rendering digital video at all frame rates encoded in source files with 1920 X 1080 pixel resolution. Most notably, a "Full HD" set is not guaranteed to support the 1080p24 format, leading to consumer confusion. DigitalEurope (formerly EICTA) maintains the HD ready 1080p logo program that requires the certified TV sets to support 1080p24, 1080p50, and 1080p60, without overscan/underscan and picture distortion.

=== Computer monitors ===
Most widescreen cathode-ray tube (CRT) and liquid-crystal display (LCD) monitors can natively display 1080p content. For example, widescreen WUXGA monitors support 1920 × 1200 resolution, which can display a pixel for pixel reproduction of the 1080p (1920 × 1080) format. Additionally, many 23, 24, and 27-inch (690 mm) widescreen LCD monitors use 1920 × 1200 as their native resolution; 30 inch displays can display beyond 1080p at up to 2560 × 1600 (1600p). Many 27" monitors have native resolutions of 2560 × 1440 and hence operate at 1440p.

==== Laptops ====
Sony has their first and formerly Vaio 1080p laptop, VPCCB17FG, in 2011, and since Asus also has their first 4K laptop GL502 which was formerly branded Republic of Gamers in 2017, 1080p has also become the nowadays lowest standard for laptops.

=== Video game consoles ===
While Microsoft's original Xbox, launched as part of the sixth generation of video game consoles in 2001, could support a 1080i output in limited circumstances, support for 1080p began with the launch of the seventh generation of home video game consoles in 2005. Both the Xbox 360 and PlayStation 3 were capable of outputting at 1080p, with only the Wii unable to support the resolution. All home video game consoles launched as part of the eighth generation, which began in 2012 with the launch of the Wii U, were capable of 1080p outputs. Mid-generation hardware revisions and new models introduced by Sony and Microsoft to their respective PlayStation 4 and Xbox One consoles added the capability of outputting at 4K UHD — well beyond 1080p. Moreover, this mid-generational improvement in computing power also represented a leap in the ability of video game consoles to render gaming content at a 1080p resolution or higher, rather than relying on upscaling. This trend continued with the launch of the current ninth generation of video game consoles in 2020, in which both Sony's PlayStation 5 and Microsoft's Xbox Series X were advertised as including 8K UHD support. As of 2024, however, neither console yet supports outputting the standard and PlayStation 5 packaging no longer advertises the feature. The Nintendo Switch console displays in resolutions up to 1080p when docked, while the successor console, Nintendo Switch 2, displays in 1080p when undocked, and up to 4K when docked.

=== Cameras ===
Many cameras—professional and consumer still, action and video cameras, including DSLR cameras—and other devices with built-in cameras such as laptops, smartphones and tablet computers, can capture 1080p24, 1080p25, 1080p30 or 1080p60 video, often encoding it in progressive segmented frame format.

== See also ==
- List of common display resolutions
- 4320p, 2160p, 1440p, 1080i, 720p, 576p, 576i, 480p, 480i, 360p, 240p
- 21:9 aspect ratio – a common widescreen cinema aspect ratio
- 10K resolution – digital video formats with a horizontal resolution of around 10,000 pixels, aimed at non-television computer monitor usage
- 16K resolution – experimental VR format
- Ultra-high-definition television (UHDTV) – digital video formats with resolutions of 4K (3840 × 2160) and 8K (7680 × 4320)
- Rec. 2020 – ITU-R Recommendation for UHDTV
- High Efficiency Video Coding (HEVC) – video standard that supports 4K & 8K UHDTV and resolutions up to 8192 × 4320
- Digital cinema
- Display resolution
