= 720p =

DHA

This chart shows the most common display resolutions, 720p being one of the 16:9 formats shown in blue.

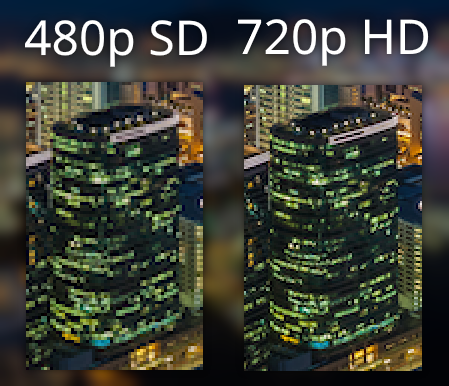
Small details are sharper and more well-defined in 720p compared to standard-definition 480p.

720p (720 lines progressive) is a progressive HD signal format with 720 horizontal lines/1280 columns and an aspect ratio (AR) of 16:9, normally known as widescreen HD (1.78:1). All major HD broadcasting standards (such as SMPTE 292M) include a 720p format, which has a resolution of 1280×720.

The number 720 stands for the 720 horizontal scan lines of image display resolution (also known as 720 pixels of vertical resolution). The p stands for progressive scan, i.e. non-interlaced. When broadcast at 60 (Note: It is, however, more commonly broadcast at (60/1.001), or precisely 59.9̅4̅0̅0̅5̅9̅9̅4̅, matching the NTSC SDTV field rate; this and the 50.00 Hz of PAL are still the second and third highest standard framerates.) frames per second, 720p features the highest temporal resolution possible under the ATSC and DVB standards. The term assumes a widescreen aspect ratio of 16:9, thus implying a resolution of 1280×720 px (0.9 megapixels).

720i (720 lines interlaced) is an erroneous term found in numerous sources and publications. Typically, it is a typographical error in which the author is referring to the 720p HDTV format. However, in some cases it is incorrectly presented as an actual alternative format to 720p. No proposed or existing broadcast standard permits 720 interlaced lines in a video frame at any frame rate.

== Comparison with interlace scanning ==
Progressive scanning reduces the need to prevent flicker by anti-aliasing single high contrast horizontal lines. It is also easier to perform high-quality 50 to 60 Hz conversion and slow-motion clips with progressive video.

== Resolutions ==
Standard	Resolution	Aspect ratio
HD	960×720p	4∶3
HD	720×960p	3∶4
HD	1280×720p	16∶9
HD	720×1280p	9∶16

== See also ==
- 1440p, 4K, Ultra-high-definition television, 1080i, 1080p.
- High-definition television (HDTV)
- Image resolution
- List of common display resolutions
