= Rec. 601 =

Standard from the International Telecommunication Union

- Rec. 601 chromaticity diagram, with 625-line (PAL and SECAM) and 525-line (NTSC SMPTE C primaries) areas shown in black and white
- Status: Approved
- First published: 1982; 44 years ago
- Latest version: BT.601-7; March 8, 2011; 15 years ago
- Authors: ITU-R (CCIR)
- Base standards: Rec.601, BT.601, CCIR 601
- Related standards: ISO/IEC MPEG, ITU-T H.26x
- Domain: Digital image processing
- Website: www.itu.int/rec/R-REC-BT.601/

ITU-R Recommendation BT.601, more commonly known by the abbreviations Rec. 601 or BT.601 (or its former name CCIR 601), is a standard originally issued in 1982 by the CCIR (an organization, which has since been renamed as the International Telecommunication Union – Radiocommunication sector) for encoding interlaced analog video signals in digital video form. It includes methods of encoding 525-line 60 Hz and 625-line 50 Hz signals, both with an active region covering 720 luminance samples and 360 chrominance samples per line. The color encoding system is known as YCbCr 4:2:2. The Rec. 601 is also used for SDTV and DVD.

The Rec. 601 video raster format has been re-used in a number of later standards, including the ISO/IEC MPEG and ITU-T H.26x compressed formats, although compressed formats for consumer applications usually use chroma subsampling reduced from the 4:2:2 sampling specified in Rec. 601 to 4:2:0.

The standard has been revised several times in its history. Its seventh edition, referred to as BT.601-7, was approved in March 2011 and was formally published in October 2011.

== Background and history ==
In the early 1980s, digital television equipment was beginning to emerge, but each manufacturer was developing their own proprietary digital versions of existing analog standards like PAL, SECAM, and NTSC.

At an ITU meeting in 1981, CCIR Study Group 11 approved document 11/1027 describing the parameter values for a unified digital video format. This was adopted as Draft Rec. AA/11 "Encoding Parameters for Digital Television for Studios" by the CCIR Plenary Assembly in February 1982, later becoming ITU-R Rec. 601.

The key feature allowing a globally accepted digital standard were the use of component coding and choosing a luminance sampling frequency that was a common multiple of the line frequencies used in analog standards. This "orthogonal" sampling approach originated from Stanley Baron of NBC.

Preparation preceded the CCIR approval, including laboratory testing around the world to validate the proposed parameter values. International negotiations and efforts to build consensus were led by figures like Mark Krivosheev, Richard Green, and representatives from Japan and Europe.

== Signal format ==
The Rec. 601 signal can be regarded as if it is a digitally encoded analog component video signal, and thus the sampling includes data for the horizontal and vertical sync and blanking intervals. Regardless of the frame rate, the luminance sampling frequency is 13.5 MHz. The samples are uniformly quantized using 8- or 10-bit PCM codes in the YCbCr domain.

For each 8-bit luminance sample, the nominal value to represent black is 16, and the value for white is 235. Eight-bit code values from 1 through 15 provide footroom and can be used to accommodate transient signal content such as filter undershoots. Similarly, code values 236 through 254 provide headroom and can be used to accommodate transient signal content such as filter overshoots. The values 0 and 255 are used to encode the sync pulses and are forbidden within the visible picture area. The Cb and Cr samples are unsigned and use the value 128 to encode the neutral color difference value, as used when encoding a white, grey or black area.

== Primary chromaticities ==
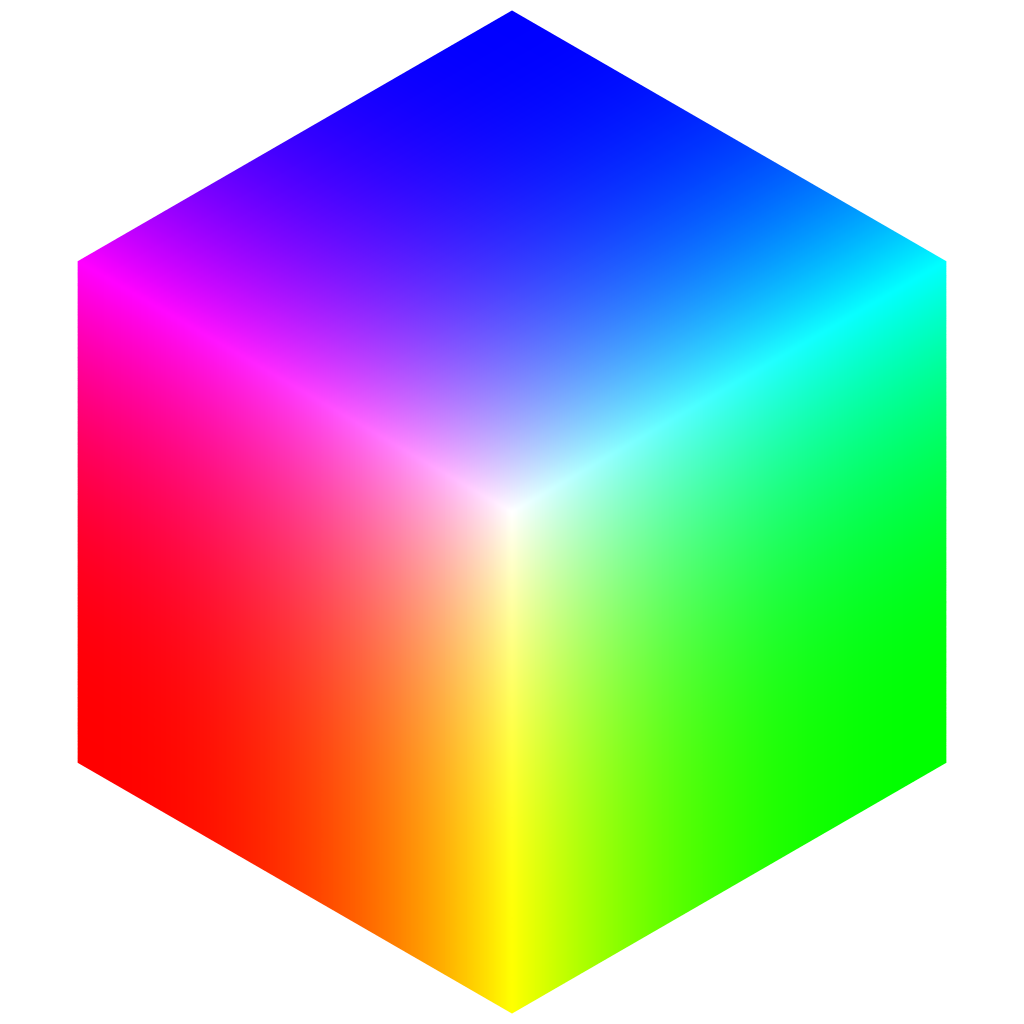
BT.601 525-line color cube (image encoded with an ICC profile)

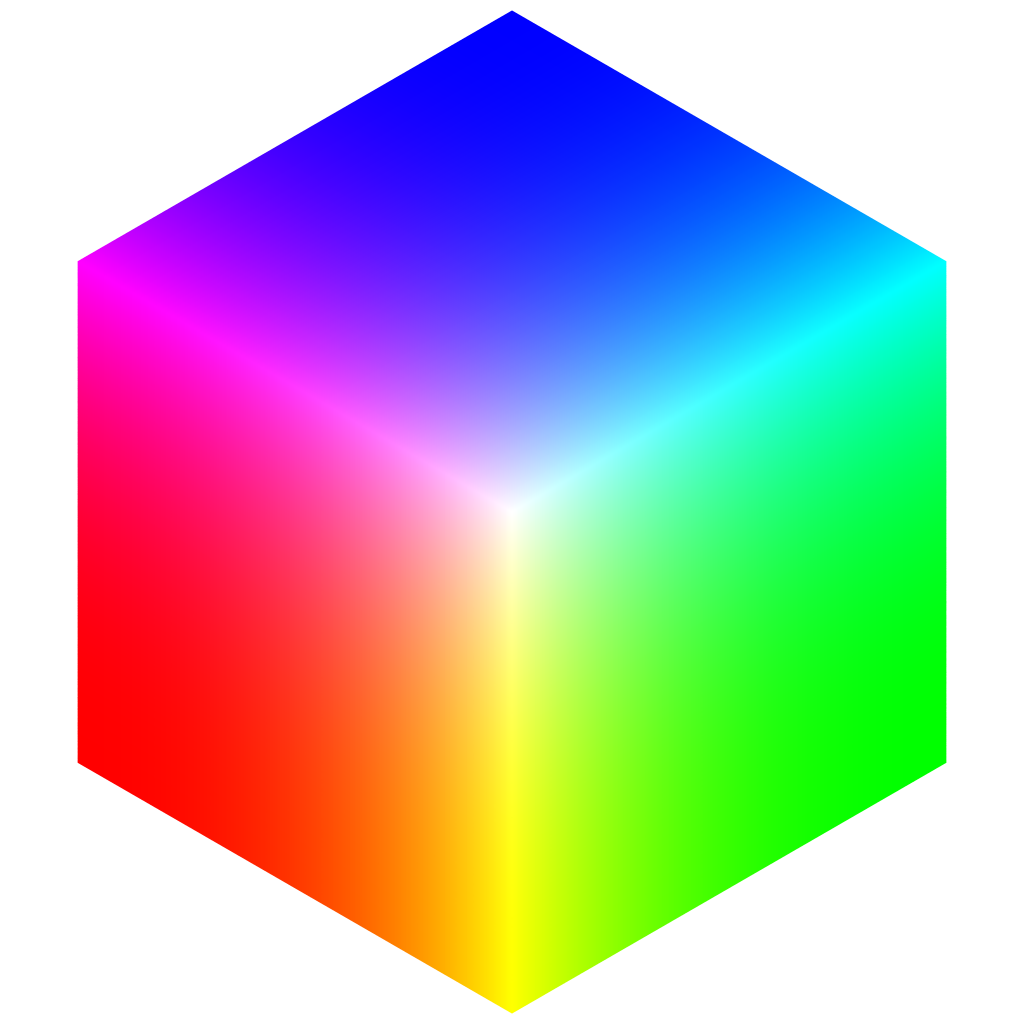
BT.601 625-line color cube (image encoded with an ICC profile)

Slightly different primaries are specified for the 625-line (PAL and SECAM) and 525-line (NTSC SMPTE C primaries) systems. Earlier versions of the standard (prior to BT.601-6, approved in January 2007) did not contain an explicit definition of the color primaries.

RGB color space parameters for Rec. 601
Color space	White point (D_{65})		Primary color					
Color space	x_{W}	y_{W}	x_{R}	y_{R}	x_{G}	y_{G}	x_{B}	y_{B}
625 lines	0.3127	0.3290	0.64	0.33	0.29	0.60	0.15	0.06
525 lines	0.3127	0.3290	0.63	0.34	0.31	0.595	0.155	0.07

== Transfer characteristics ==
Rec. 601 defines a nonlinear transfer function which is linear near 0 and then transfers to a gamma curve for the rest of the luminance range:

$$E = \begin{cases}
4.500 L & L < 0.018,\\
1.099 L^{0.45} - 0.099 & L \ge 0.018.
\end{cases}$$

== Awards ==
The CCIR received a 1982–83 Technology and Engineering Emmy Award for its development of the Rec. 601 standard.

== See also ==
- Digital component video
- YCbCr
- Rec. 709, the corresponding standard for high-definition television (HDTV)
- Rec. 2020, ITU-R Recommendation for ultra-high-definition television (UHDTV)
- ITU-R BT.656, ITU-R Recommendation for parallel and serial transmission formats for BT.601 video
- Pixel aspect ratio
