= ITU-R BT.656 =

Simple digital video protocol for standard-definition television

ITU-R Recommendation BT.656, sometimes also called ITU656, is a simple digital video protocol for streaming uncompressed PAL or NTSC standard-definition television (625 or 525 lines) signals. The protocol builds upon the 4:2:2 digital video encoding parameters defined in ITU-R Recommendation BT.601, which provides interlaced video data, streaming each field separately, and uses the YCbCr color space and a 13.5 MHz sampling frequency for pixels.

The standard can be implemented to transmit either 8-bit values (the standard in consumer electronics) or 10-bit values (sometimes used in studio environments). Both a parallel and a serial transmission format are defined. For the parallel format, a 25-pin D-Sub connector pinout and ECL logic levels are defined. The serial format can be transmitted over 75-ohm coaxial cable with BNC connectors, but there is also a fibre-optical version defined.

The parallel version of the ITU-R BT.656 protocol is also used in many TV sets between chips using CMOS logic levels. Typical applications include the interface between a PAL/NTSC decoder chip and a DAC integrated circuit for driving a CRT in a TV set.

== Data format ==
A BT.656 data stream is a sequence of 8-bit or 10-bit words, transmitted at a rate of 27 Mword/s. Horizontal scan lines of video pixel data are delimited in the stream by 4-byte long SAV (Start of Active Video) and EAV (End of Active Video) code sequences. SAV codes also contain status bits indicating line position in a video field or frame. Line position in a full frame can be determined by tracking SAV status bits, allowing receivers to 'synchronize' with an incoming stream.

Individual pixels in a line are coded in YCbCr format. After an SAV code (4 bytes) is sent, the first 8 bits of Cb (chroma U) data are sent then 8 bits of Y (luma), followed by 8 bits of Cr (chroma V) for the next pixel and then 8 bits of Y. To reconstruct full resolution Y, Cb, Cr pixel values, chroma upsampling must be used.

== See also ==
- Rec. 601
- Serial digital interface
