= SMPTE 259M =

Serial digital interface for video transport

SMPTE 259M is a standard published by SMPTE which "describes a 10-bit serial digital interface operating at 143/270/360 Mb/s."

The goal of SMPTE 259M is to define a serial digital interface (based on a coaxial cable), called SDI or SD-SDI.

There are 4 bit rates defined, which are normally used to transfer the following standard video formats:

Variant	Bit rate	Aspect ratio	Total lines (per frame)	Active pixels (per line)	Active lines	Frame rate
SMPTE 259M-A	143 Mbit/s	4:3	525	768	486	59.94i
SMPTE 259M-B	177 Mbit/s	4:3	625	948	576	50i
SMPTE 259M-C	270 Mbit/s	4:3 or 16:9	525	720	486	59.94i
SMPTE 259M-C	270 Mbit/s	4:3 or 16:9	625	720	576	50i
SMPTE 259M-D	360 Mbit/s	16:9	525	960	486	59.94i
