= Progressive scan =

Format of image storage or transmission in which each line is read sequentially

Progressive scanning (alternatively referred to as noninterlaced scanning) is a format of displaying, storing, or transmitting moving images in which all the lines of each frame are drawn in sequence. This is in contrast to interlaced video used in traditional analog television systems where only the odd lines, then the even lines of each frame (each image called a video field) are drawn alternately, so that only half the number of actual image frames are used to produce video. The system was originally known as "sequential scanning" when it was used in the Baird 240 line television transmissions from Alexandra Palace, United Kingdom in 1936. It was also used in Baird's experimental transmissions using 30 lines in the 1920s. Progressive scanning became universally used in computer screens beginning in the early 21st century.

== Interline twitter ==
Interline twitter when the refresh rate is slowed by a factor of three, demonstrated using the Indian-head test pattern

This rough animation compares progressive scan with interlace scan, also demonstrating the interline twitter effect associated with interlacing. On the left there are two progressive scan images. In the middle there are two interlaced images and on the right there are two images with line doublers. The original resolutions are above and the ones with spatial anti-aliasing are below. The interlaced images use half the bandwidth of the progressive ones. The images in the center column precisely duplicate the pixels of the ones on the left, but interlacing causes details to twitter. Real interlaced video blurs such details to prevent twittering, but as seen in the pictures of the lower row, such softening (or anti-aliasing) comes at the cost of image clarity. A line doubler shown in the bottom right picture cannot restore the previously interlaced image in the center to the full quality of the progressive image shown in the top left.

Note: Because the refresh rate has been slowed by a factor of three, and the resolution is less than half a resolution of a typical interlaced video, the flicker in the simulated interlaced portions and also the visibility of the black lines in these examples are exaggerated. Also, the images above are based on what it would look like on a monitor that does not support interlaced scan, such as a PC monitor or an LCD or plasma-based television set, with the interlaced images displayed using the same mode as the progressive images.

== Usage in storing or transmitting ==
Progressive scan is used for scanning and storing film-based material on DVDs, for example, as 480p24 or 576p25 formats. Progressive scan was included in the Grand Alliance's technical standard for HDTV in the early 1990s. It was agreed that all film transmission by HDTV would be broadcast with progressive scan in the United States. Even if a signal is sent interlaced, an HDTV will convert it to progressive scan.

== Usage in TVs, video projectors, and monitors ==
Progressive scan is used for all LCD computer monitors and most HDTVs. Most cathode-ray tube (CRT) computer monitors and CRT-type displays, such as SDTVs, needed to use interlace to achieve full vertical resolution, but could display progressive video at the cost of halving the vertical resolution. Before HDTV became common, some televisions and video projectors were produced with one or more full-resolution progressive-scan inputs, allowing these displays to take advantage of formats like PALPlus, progressive scan DVD players, and certain video game consoles. Early HDTVs supported the progressively-scanned resolutions of 480p and 720p with 1080p displays available at higher cost. At the debut of UHD, TVs had emerged on the consumer market in the 2010s, also using progressive resolutions, but usually sold with prohibitive prices (4K HDTVs) or were still in prototype stage (8K HDTVs). Prices for consumer-grade 4K HDTVs have since lowered and become more affordable, which has increased their prevalence amongst consumers. Computer monitors can use even greater display resolutions.

The disadvantage of progressive scan is that it requires higher bandwidth than interlaced video that has the same frame size and vertical refresh rate. Because of this 1080p is not used for broadcast. For explanations of why interlacing was originally used, see interlaced video. For an in-depth explanation of the fundamentals and advantages/disadvantages of converting interlaced video to a progressive format, see deinterlacing.

=== Advantages ===
The main advantage with progressive scan is that motion appears smoother and more realistic. There is an absence of visual artifacts associated with interlaced video of the same line rate, such as interline twitter. Frames have no interlace artifacts and can be captured for use as still photos. With progressive scan there is no need to introduce intentional blurring (sometimes referred to as anti-aliasing) to reduce interline twitter and eye strain.

In the case of most media, such as DVD movies and video games, the video is blurred during the authoring process itself to subdue interline twitter when played back on interlaced displays. As a consequence, recovering the sharpness of the original video is impossible when the video is viewed progressively. A user-intuitive solution to this is when display hardware and video games come equipped with options to blur the video at will, or to keep it at its original sharpness. This allows the viewer to achieve the desired image sharpness with both interlaced and progressive displays.

Progressive scan also offers clearer and faster results for scaling to higher resolutions than its equivalent interlaced video, such as upconverting 480p to display on a 1080p HDTV. HDTVs not based on CRT technology cannot natively display interlaced video, therefore interlaced video must be deinterlaced before it is scaled and displayed. Deinterlacing can result in noticeable visual artifacts and/or input lag between the video source and the display device.

== See also ==
- 1440p
- Deinterlacing
- High Efficiency Video Coding
- Progressive segmented frame: a scheme designed to acquire, store, modify, and distribute progressive-scan video using interlaced equipment and media
