= 480p =

Shorthand name for a family of video display resolutions

480p is the shorthand name for a family of video display resolutions. The p stands for progressive scan, i.e. non-interlaced. The 480 denotes a vertical resolution of 480 pixels, usually with a horizontal resolution of 640 pixels and 4:3 aspect ratio (480 × 4/3 = 640) or a horizontal resolution of 854 (848 should be used for mod16 compatibility) pixels for an approximate 16:9 aspect ratio (480 × 16/9 = 853.3̅). Since a pixel count must be a whole number, in Wide VGA displays it is generally rounded up to 854 to ensure inclusion of the entire image. The frames are displayed progressively as opposed to interlaced. 480p was used for many early plasma televisions. Standard definition has always been a 4:3 aspect ratio with a pixel resolution of 720 × 480 at 60 Hz for NTSC regions, and 720 or 768 × 576 for PAL regions (1024 wide for widescreen displays). However, standard definition defines a 15.7 kHz horizontal scanrate, which means that interlacing has to be used for those resolution modes. The lowercase letter "p" in 480p stands for progressive, so the two must not be confused.

== ATSC progressive mode standards ==
The ATSC digital television standards define 480p with 640×480p (4:3) pixel resolutions, at 24, 30, or 60 frames per second.

When 480p30 is broadcast on air, it is frame doubled then interlaced to 480i60. In case of 480p24, it is processed using the 3:2 pulldown technique to 480i60. In both cases the spatial resolution doesn't change, but the conversion to a interlaced format allows a direct digital to analog conversion for eventual broadcast on the analog television network.

== Resolutions ==
Standard	Resolution	Aspect ratio	Notes
480p (1:1)	480 × 480p	1:1	Typically used for social media videos and images.
480p (4:3)	640 × 480p	4:3	The most common 480p aspect ratio, typically used for cameras and video formats. (See also: VGA.)
480p (3:2)	720 × 480p	3:2	The same aspect ratio used on the iPod Touch 4 and is also used anamorphically on NTSC-region DVD video.
480p (8:5)	768 × 480p	8:5	-
480p (5:3)	800 × 480p	5:3	This resolution is used on the Samsung Galaxy S II.
480p (16:9)	848 × 480p	~16:9	The mod16 compatible.
480p (16:9)	854 × 480p	~16:9	The resolution 854×480 is used when 480p is selected on a widescreen YouTube video.
480p (18:10)	864 × 480p	18:10	-
480p (1.85:1)	888 × 480p	1.85:1	The unscaled Academy format.
480p (2:1)	960 × 480p	2:1	The double-squared 480p.

== See also ==
- Enhanced-definition television (EDTV)
- List of common display resolutions
