= B-Y =

Color difference signal

$B-Y$ indicates a color difference signal between blue (B) and a luminance component, as part of a luminance (Y) and chrominance (C) color model. It has different meanings depending on the exact model used:

- U in YUV, a generic model used for analog and digital image formats
- Cb in YCbCr, used for digital images and video
- Pb in YPbPr, used in analog component video
- Db in YDbDr, used in analog SECAM

== See also ==
- R-Y – The corresponding signal for red
