= R-Y =

Color difference signal

$R-Y$ indicates a color difference signal between red (R) and a luminance component, as part of a luminance (Y) and chrominance (C) color model. It has different meanings depending on the exact model used:

- V in YUV, a generic model used for analog and digital image formats
- Cr in YCbCr, used for digital images and video
- Pr in YPbPr, used in analog component video
- Dr in YDbDr, used in analog SECAM

== See also ==
- B-Y – The corresponding signal for blue
