= YDbDr =

Colour space used in the SECAM analog color TV standard

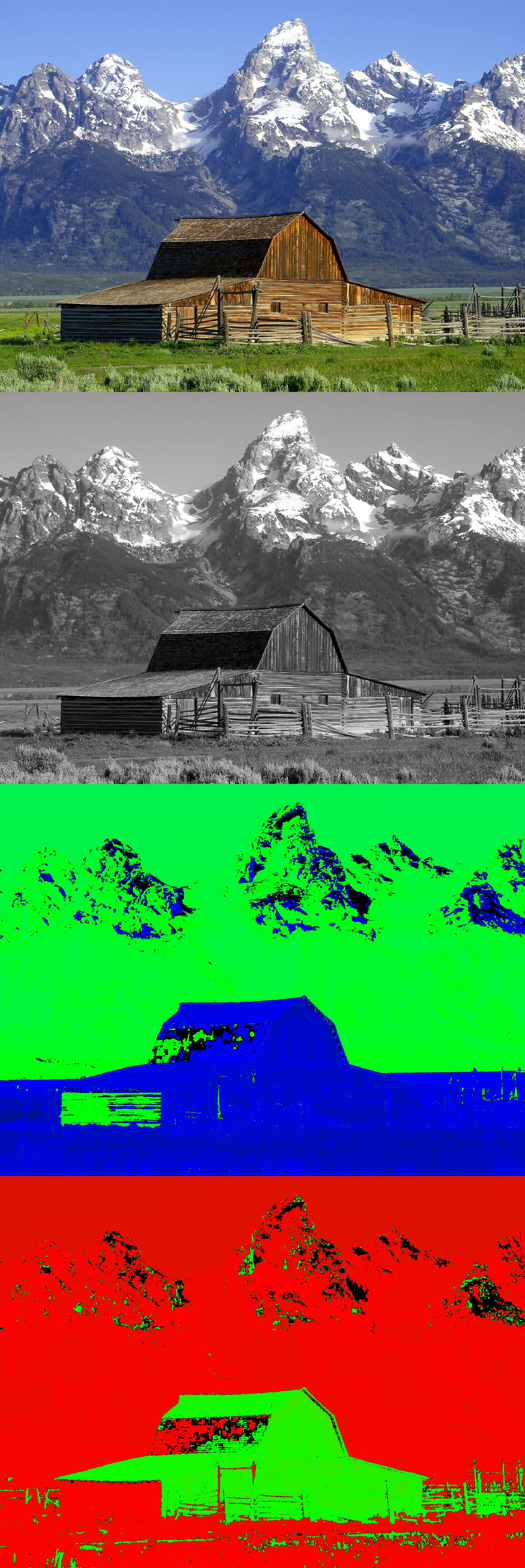
An image along with its $Y$, $D_B$ and $D_R$ components.

YDbDr, sometimes written $YD_BD_R$, was the colour space used in the SECAM (adopted in France and some countries of the former Eastern Bloc) analog colour television broadcasting standard. It is very close to YUV (used on the PAL system) and its related colour spaces such as YIQ (used on the NTSC system), YPbPr and YCbCr.

$YD_BD_R$ is composed of three components: $Y$, $D_B$ and $D_R$. $Y$ is the luminance, $D_B$ and $D_R$ are the chrominance components, representing the red and blue colour differences.

== Formulas ==
The three component signals are created from an original $RGB$ (red, green and blue) source. The weighted values of $R$, $G$ and $B$ are added together to produce a single $Y$ signal, representing the overall brightness, or luminance, of that spot. The $D_B$ signal is then created by subtracting the $Y$ from the blue signal of the original $RGB$, and then scaling; and $D_R$ by subtracting the $Y$ from the red, and then scaling by a different factor.

These formulae approximate the conversion between the RGB colour space and $YD_BD_R$.

$$\begin{align}
R, G, B, Y &\in \left[ 0, 1 \right]\\
D_B, D_R &\in \left[ -1.333, 1.333 \right]\end{align}$$

From RGB to YDbDr:

$$\begin{align}
Y   &= +0.299 R +0.587 G +0.114 B\\
D_B &= -0.450 R -0.883 G +1.333 B\\
D_R &= -1.333 R +1.116 G +0.217B\\
\begin{bmatrix} Y \\ D_B \\ D_R \end{bmatrix} &=
\begin{bmatrix} 0.299 & 0.587 & 0.114 \\
-0.450 & -0.883 & 1.333 \\
-1.333 & 1.116 & 0.217 \end{bmatrix}
\begin{bmatrix} R \\ G \\ B \end{bmatrix}\end{align}$$

From YDbDr to RGB:

$$\begin{align}
R &= Y +0.000092303716148 D_B -0.525912630661865 D_R\\
G &= Y -0.129132898890509 D_B +0.267899328207599 D_R\\
B &= Y +0.664679059978955 D_B -0.000079202543533 D_R\\
\begin{bmatrix} R \\ G \\ B \end{bmatrix} &=
\begin{bmatrix} 1 & 0.000092303716148 & -0.525912630661865 \\
1 & -0.129132898890509 & 0.267899328207599 \\
1 & 0.664679059978955 & -0.000079202543533 \end{bmatrix}
\begin{bmatrix} Y \\ D_B \\ D_R \end{bmatrix}\end{align}$$

You may note that the $Y$ component of $YD_BD_R$ is the same as the $Y$ component of $Y$$U$$V$. $D_B$ and $D_R$ are related to the $U$ and $V$ components of the YUV colour space as follows:

$$\begin{align}
D_B &= + 3.059 U\\
D_R &= - 2.169 V\end{align}$$

== See also ==
- YUV - related colour system
