= Y′UV =

Mathematical color model

Example of U-V color plane, Y′ value = 0.5, represented within RGB color gamut

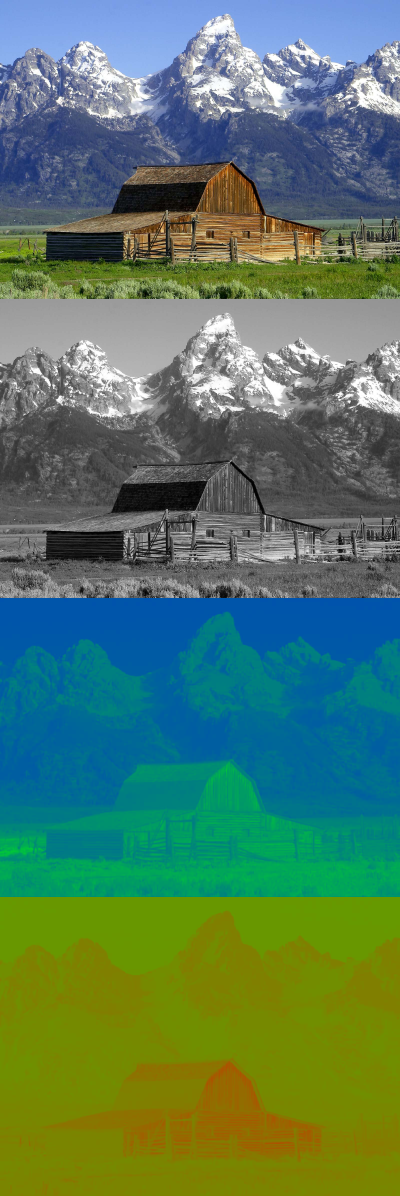
An image along with its Y′, U, and V components respectively

Y′UV, also written YUV, is the color model found in the PAL analogue color TV standard. A color is described as a Y′ component (luma) and two chroma components U and V. The prime symbol (′) denotes that the luma is calculated from gamma-corrected RGB input and that it is different from true luminance. Today, the term YUV is commonly used loosely in the computer industry to describe colorspaces that are encoded using more recent similar standards such as YCbCr.

In TV formats, color information (U and V) was added separately via a subcarrier so that a black-and-white receiver would still be able to receive and display a color picture transmission in the receiver's native black-and-white format, with no need for extra transmission bandwidth.

As for etymology, Y, Y′, U, and V are not abbreviations. The use of the letter Y for luminance can be traced back to the choice of XYZ primaries. This lends itself naturally to the usage of the same letter in luma (Y′), which approximates a perceptually uniform correlate of luminance. Likewise, U and V were chosen to differentiate the U and V axes from those in other spaces, such as the x and y chromaticity space. See the equations below or compare the historical development of the math.

== Related color models ==
The scope of the terms Y′UV, YUV, YCbCr, YPbPr, etc., is sometimes ambiguous and overlapping.

- Y′UV is the separation used in PAL.
- YDbDr is the format used in SECAM, unusually based on non-gamma-corrected (linear) RGB, making the Y component true luminance.
- Y'IQ is the separation used in NTSC television.
- Y'PbPr is any separation used in analogue component video, derived by converting the phase (P) television signal into amplitude.
- Y'CbCr is any digital encoding of Y'PbPr suited for video and image compression and transmission formats such as MPEG and JPEG.
- Y'CoCg is a similar separation that offers better performance and lossless round-tripping, used in newer video codecs and JPEG XR.

All these formats are based on a luma component and two chroma components describing the color difference from gray. In all formats other than Y′IQ, each chroma component is a scaled version of the difference between red/blue and Y; the main difference lies in the scaling factors used, which is determined by color primaries and the intended numeric range (compare the use of U_{max} and V_{max} in § SDTV with BT.470 with a fixed 1/2 in YCbCr § R'G'B' to Y'PbPr). In Y′IQ, the UV plane is rotated by 33°.

== History ==
Y′UV was invented when engineers wanted color television in a black-and-white infrastructure. They needed a signal transmission method that was compatible with black-and-white (B&W) TV while being able to add color. The luma component already existed as the black and white signal; they added the UV signal to this as a solution.

The UV representation of chrominance was chosen over straight R and B signals because U and V are color difference signals. In other words, the U and V signals tell the television to shift the color of a certain spot without altering its brightness, or to make one color brighter at the cost of the other and by how much it should be shifted. The higher (or the lower when negative) the U and V values are, the more saturated (colorful) the spot gets. The closer the U and V values get to zero, the lesser it shifts the color meaning that the red, green and blue lights will be more equally bright, producing a grayer spot. This is the benefit of using color difference signals, i.e. instead of telling how much red there is to a color, it tells by how much it is more red than green or blue.

In turn this meant that when the U and V signals would be zero or absent, it would just display a grayscale image. If R and B were to have been used, these would have non-zero values even in a B&W scene, requiring all three data-carrying signals. This was important in the early days of color television, because old black and white TV signals had no U and V signals present, meaning the color TV would just display it as B&W TV out of the box. In addition, black and white receivers could take the Y′ signal and ignore the U- and V-color signals, making Y′UV backward-compatible with all existing black-and-white equipment, input and output. If the color-TV standard wouldn't have used color difference signals, it could mean a color TV would make funny colors out of a B&W broadcast or it would need additional circuitry to translate the B&W signal to color.

It was necessary to assign a narrower bandwidth to the chrominance channel because there was no additional bandwidth available. If some of the luminance information arrived via the chrominance channel (as it would have if RB signals were used instead of differential UV signals), B&W resolution would have been compromised.

== Conversion to/from RGB ==
=== SDTV with BT.470 ===
Y′UV signals are typically created from RGB (red, green and blue) source. Weighted values of R, G, and B are summed to produce Y′, a measure of overall brightness or luminance. U and V are computed as scaled differences between Y′ and the B and R values.

PAL (NTSC used YIQ, which is further rotated) standard defines the following constants, derived from BT.470 System M primaries and white point using SMPTE RP 177 (same constants called matrix coefficients were used later in BT.601, although it uses 1/2 instead of 0.436 and 0.615):

$$\begin{align}
W_R &= 0.299, \\
W_G &= 1 - W_R - W_B = 0.587, \\
W_B &= 0.114, \\
U_\text{max} &= 0.436, \\
V_\text{max} &= 0.615.
\end{align}$$

PAL signals in Y′UV are computed from R'G'B' (only SECAM IV used linear RGB) as follows:

$$\begin{align}
Y' &= W_R R' + W_G G' + W_B B' = 0.299 R' + 0.587 G' + 0.114 B', \\
U &= U_\text{max} \frac{B' - Y'}{1 - W_B} \approx 0.492(B' - Y'), \\
V &= V_\text{max} \frac{R' - Y'}{1 - W_R} \approx 0.877(R' - Y').
\end{align}$$

The resulting ranges of Y′, U, and V respectively are [0, 1], [−U_{max}, U_{max}], and [−V_{max}, V_{max}].

Inverting the above transformation converts Y′UV to RGB:

$$\begin{align}
R' &= Y' + V \frac{1 - W_R}{V_\text{max}} = Y' +  \frac{V}{0.877} = Y' +  1.14 V,\\
G' &= Y' - U \frac{W_B (1 - W_B)}{U_\text{max} W_G} - V \frac{W_R (1 - W_R)}{V_\text{max} W_G} \\
&= Y' - \frac{0.232 U}{0.587} -  \frac{0.341 V}{0.587} = Y' - 0.395 U - 0.581 V, \\
B' &= Y' + U \frac{1 - W_B}{U_\text{max}} = Y' +  \frac{U}{0.492} = Y' +  2.033 U.
\end{align}$$

Equivalently, substituting values for the constants and expressing them as matrices gives these formulas for BT.470 System M (PAL):

$$\begin{align}
\begin{bmatrix} Y' \\ U \\ V \end{bmatrix}
&=
\begin{bmatrix}
0.299   &  0.587   &  0.114 \\
-0.14713 & -0.28886 &  0.436 \\
0.615   & -0.51499 & -0.10001
\end{bmatrix}
\begin{bmatrix} R' \\ G' \\ B' \end{bmatrix}, \\
\begin{bmatrix} R' \\ G' \\ B' \end{bmatrix}
&=
\begin{bmatrix}
1 &  0       &  1.13983 \\
1 & -0.39465 & -0.58060 \\
1 &  2.03211 &  0
\end{bmatrix}
\begin{bmatrix} Y' \\ U \\ V \end{bmatrix}.
\end{align}$$

For small values of Y' it is possible to get R, G, or B values that are negative so in practice we clamp the RGB results to the interval [0,1] or more correctly clamp inside the Y'CbCr.

In BT.470 a mistake was made because 0.115 was used instead of 0.114 for blue and 0.493 was the result instead of 0.492. In practice that did not affect the decoders because the approximation 1/2.03 was used.

=== HDTV with BT.709 ===
HDTV Rec. 709 (quite close to SDTV Rec. 601) compared with UHDTV Rec. 2020

For HDTV the ATSC decided to change the basic values for W_{R} and W_{B} compared to the previously selected values in the SDTV system. For HDTV these values are provided by Rec. 709. This decision further impacted on the matrix for the Y′UV↔RGB conversion so that its member values are also slightly different. As a result, with SDTV and HDTV there are generally two distinct Y′UV representations possible for any RGB triple: a SDTV-Y′UV and an HDTV-Y′UV one. This means in detail that when directly converting between SDTV and HDTV, the luma (Y′) information is roughly the same but the representation of the chroma (U & V) channel information needs conversion. Still in coverage of the CIE 1931 color space the Rec. 709 color space is almost identical to Rec. 601 and covers 35.9%. In contrast to this UHDTV with Rec. 2020 covers a much larger area and thus its very own matrix was derived for YCbCr (no YUV/Y′UV, since decommissioning of analog TV).

BT.709 defines these weight values:

$$\begin{align}
W_R &= 0.2126, \\
W_G &= 1 - W_R - W_B = 0.7152, \\
W_B &= 0.0722 \\
\end{align}$$

The U_{max} and V_{max} values are from above.

The conversion matrices for analog form of BT.709 are these, but there is no evidence those were ever used in practice (instead only actually described form of BT.709 is used, the YCbCr form):

$$\begin{align}
\begin{bmatrix} Y' \\ U \\ V \end{bmatrix}
&=
\begin{bmatrix}
0.2126  &  0.7152  &  0.0722 \\
-0.09991 & -0.33609 &  0.436 \\
0.615   & -0.55861 & -0.05639
\end{bmatrix}
\begin{bmatrix} R' \\ G' \\ B' \end{bmatrix} \\
\begin{bmatrix} R' \\ G' \\ B' \end{bmatrix}
&=
\begin{bmatrix}
1 &  0       &  1.28033 \\
1 & -0.21482 & -0.38059 \\
1 &  2.12798 &  0
\end{bmatrix}
\begin{bmatrix} Y' \\ U \\ V \end{bmatrix}
\end{align}$$

=== Notes ===
- The weights used to compute Y′ (top row of matrix) are identical to those used in the Y′IQ color space.
- Equal values of red, green and blue (i.e. levels of gray) yield 0 for U and V. Black, RGB=(0, 0, 0), yields YUV=(0, 0, 0). White, RGB=(1, 1, 1), yields YUV=(1, 0, 0).
- These formulas are traditionally used in analog televisions and equipment; digital equipment such as HDTV and digital video cameras use Y′CbCr.
UV planes in a range of Y=[0,1] using the BT.709 matrix

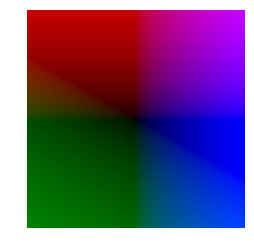
Y′ value of 0

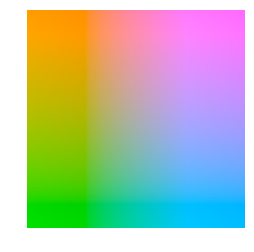
Y′ value of 0.5

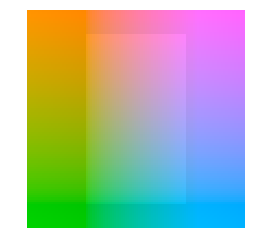
Y′ value of 0.5, with untruncated gamut shown by the center rectangle

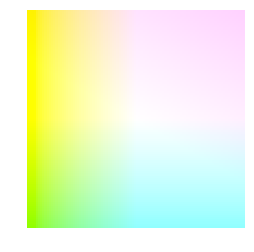
Y′ value of 1

== Luminance/chrominance systems in general ==
The primary advantage of luma/chroma systems such as Y′UV, and its relatives Y′IQ and YDbDr, is that they remain compatible with black and white analog television (largely due to the work of Georges Valensi). The Y′ channel saves all the data recorded by black and white cameras, so it produces a signal suitable for reception on old monochrome displays. In this case, the U and V are simply discarded. If displaying color, all three channels are used, and the original RGB information can be decoded.

Another advantage of Y′UV is that some of the information can be discarded in order to reduce bandwidth. The human eye has fairly little spatial sensitivity to color: the accuracy of the brightness information of the luminance channel has far more impact on the image detail discerned than that of the other two. Understanding this human shortcoming, standards such as NTSC and PAL reduce the bandwidth of the chrominance channels considerably. (Bandwidth is in the temporal domain, but this translates into the spatial domain as the image is scanned out.)

Therefore, the resulting U and V signals can be substantially "compressed". In the NTSC (Y′IQ) and PAL systems, the chrominance signals had significantly narrower bandwidth than that for the luminance. Early versions of NTSC rapidly alternated between particular colors in identical image areas to make them appear adding up to each other to the human eye, while all modern analogue and even most digital video standards use chroma subsampling by recording a picture's color information at reduced resolution. Only half the horizontal resolution compared to the brightness information is kept (termed 4:2:2 chroma subsampling), and often the vertical resolution is also halved (giving 4:2:0). The 4:x:x standard was adopted due to the very earliest color NTSC standard which used a chroma subsampling of 4:1:1 (where the horizontal color resolution is quartered while the vertical is full resolution) so that the picture carried only a quarter as much color resolution compared to brightness resolution. Today, only high-end equipment processing uncompressed signals uses a chroma subsampling of 4:4:4 with identical resolution for both brightness and color information.

The I and Q axes were chosen according to bandwidth needed by human vision, one axis being that requiring the most bandwidth, and the other (fortuitously at 90 degrees) the minimum. However, true I and Q demodulation was relatively more complex, requiring two analog delay lines, and NTSC receivers rarely used it.

However, this color modulation strategy is lossy, particularly because of crosstalk from the luma to the chroma-carrying wire, and vice versa, in analogue equipment (including RCA connectors to transfer a digital signal, as all they carry is analogue composite video, which is either YUV, YIQ, or even CVBS). Furthermore, NTSC and PAL encoded color signals in a manner that causes high bandwidth chroma and luma signals to mix with each other in a bid to maintain backward compatibility with black and white television equipment, which results in dot crawl and cross color artifacts. When the NTSC standard was created in the 1950s, this was not a real concern since the quality of the image was limited by the monitor equipment, not the limited-bandwidth signal being received. However today's modern television is capable of displaying more information than is contained in these lossy signals. To keep pace with the abilities of new display technologies, attempts were made since the late 1970s to preserve more of the Y′UV signal while transferring images, such as SCART (1977) and S-Video (1987) connectors.

Instead of Y′UV, Y′CbCr was used as the standard format for (digital) common video compression algorithms such as MPEG-2. Digital television and DVDs preserve their compressed video streams in the MPEG-2 format, which uses a fully defined Y′CbCr color space, although retaining the established process of chroma subsampling. Cinepak, a video codec from 1991, used a modified YUV 4:2:0 colorspace. The professional CCIR 601 digital video format also uses Y′CbCr at the common chroma subsampling rate of 4:2:2, primarily for compatibility with previous analog video standards. This stream can be easily mixed into any output format needed.

Y′UV is not an absolute color space. It is a way of encoding RGB information, and the actual color displayed depends on the actual RGB colorants used to display the signal. Therefore, a value expressed as Y′UV is only predictable if standard RGB colorants are used (i.e. a fixed set of primary chromaticities, or particular set of red, green, and blue).

Furthermore, the range of colors and brightnesses (known as the color gamut and color volume) of RGB (whether it be BT.601 or Rec. 709) is far smaller than the range of colors and brightnesses allowed by Y′UV. This can be very important when converting from Y′UV (or Y′CbCr) to RGB, since the formulas above can produce "invalid" RGB values – i.e., values below 0% or very far above 100% of the range (e.g., outside the standard 16–235 luma range (and 16–240 chroma range) for TVs and HD content, or outside 0–255 for standard definition on PCs). Unless these values are dealt with they will usually be "clipped" (i.e., limited) to the valid range of the channel affected. This changes the hue of the color, which is very undesirable, so it is therefore often considered better to desaturate the offending colors such that they fall within the RGB gamut.

Likewise, when RGB at a given bit depth is converted to YUV at the same bit depth, several RGB colors can become the same Y′UV color, resulting in information loss.

== Relation with Y′CbCr ==
Y′UV is often used as a term for YCbCr. However, while related, they are different formats with different scale factors; additionally, unlike YCbCr, Y’UV has historically used two different scale factors for the U component vs. the V component. Not scaled matrix is used in Photo CD's PhotoYCC. U and V are bipolar signals which can be positive or negative, and are zero for grays, whereas YCbCr usually scales all channels to either the 16–235 range or the 0–255 range, which makes Cb and Cr unsigned quantities where 128 represents gray.

Nevertheless, the relationship between them in the standard case is simple. In particular, the Y' channels of both are linearly related to each other, both Cb and U are related linearly to (B-Y), and both Cr and V are related linearly to (R-Y).

== See also ==
- Chroma subsampling
