= Component video =

Video signal that has been split into component channels

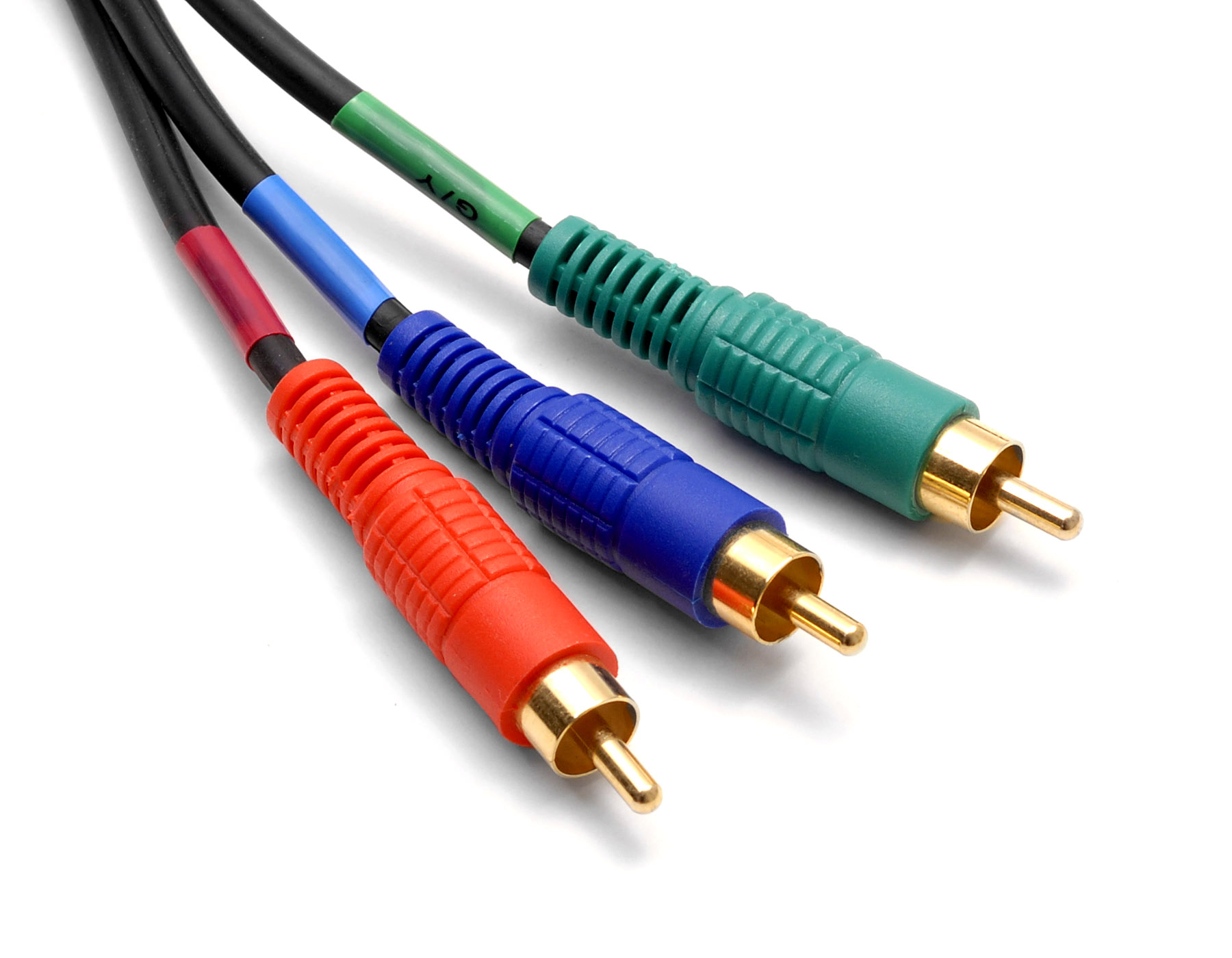
Three cables, each with RCA connectors at both ends, are often used to carry YP_{B}P_{R} analog component video.

Component video is an analog video signal split into two or more component channels. In popular use, it refers to a type of component analog video (CAV) information that is transmitted or stored as three separate signals. Component video can be contrasted with composite video in which all the video information is combined into a single signal that is used in analog television. Like composite, component cables do not carry audio and are often paired with audio cables.

When used without any other qualifications, the term component video usually refers to analog YP_{B}P_{R} component video with sync on luma (Y) found on analog high-definition televisions and associated equipment from the 1990s through the 2000s when they were largely replaced with HDMI and other all-digital standards. Component video cables and their RCA jack connectors on equipment are normally color-coded red, green and blue, although the signal is not in RGB. YP_{B}P_{R} component video can be losslessly converted to the RGB signal that internally drives the monitor; the encoding is useful as the Y signal will also work on black and white monitors.

== Analog component video ==
Reproducing a video signal on a display device (for example, a cathode-ray tube; CRT) is a straightforward process complicated by the multitude of signal sources. DVD, VHS, computers and video game consoles all store, process and transmit video signals using different methods, and often each will provide more than one signal option. One way of maintaining signal clarity is by separating the components of a video signal so that they do not interfere with each other. A signal separated in this way is called "component video". S-Video, RGB and YP_{B}P_{R} signals comprise two or more separate signals and thus are all component-video signals. For most consumer-level video applications, the common three-cable system using BNC or RCA connectors analog component video was used. Typical formats are 480i (480 lines visible, 525 full for NTSC) and 576i (576 lines visible, 625 full for PAL). For personal computer displays the 15-pin DIN connector (IBM VGA) provided screen resolutions including 640×480, 800×600, 1024×768, 1152×864, 1280×1024.

=== RGB analog component video ===
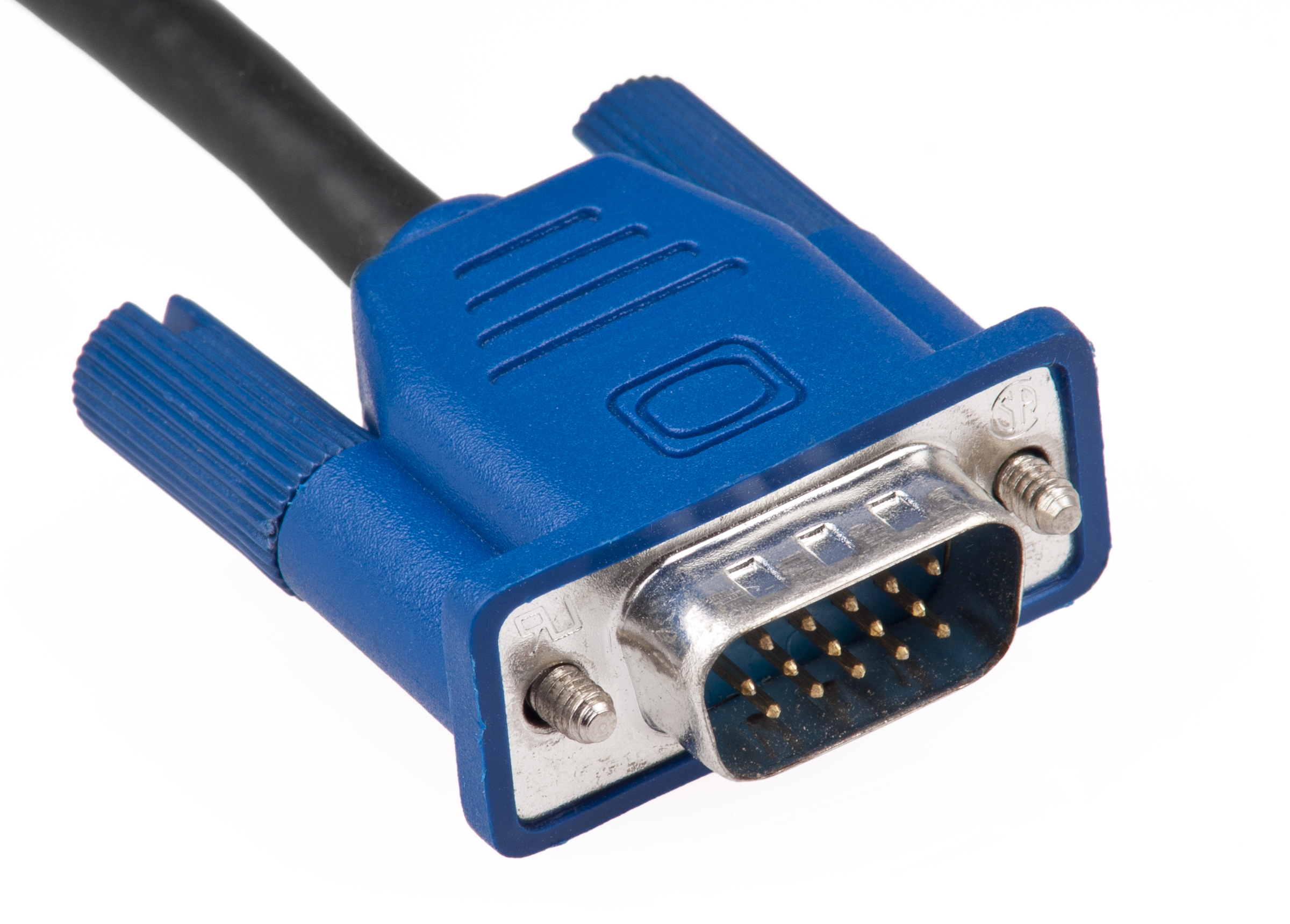
A 15-pin VGA connector for a personal computer

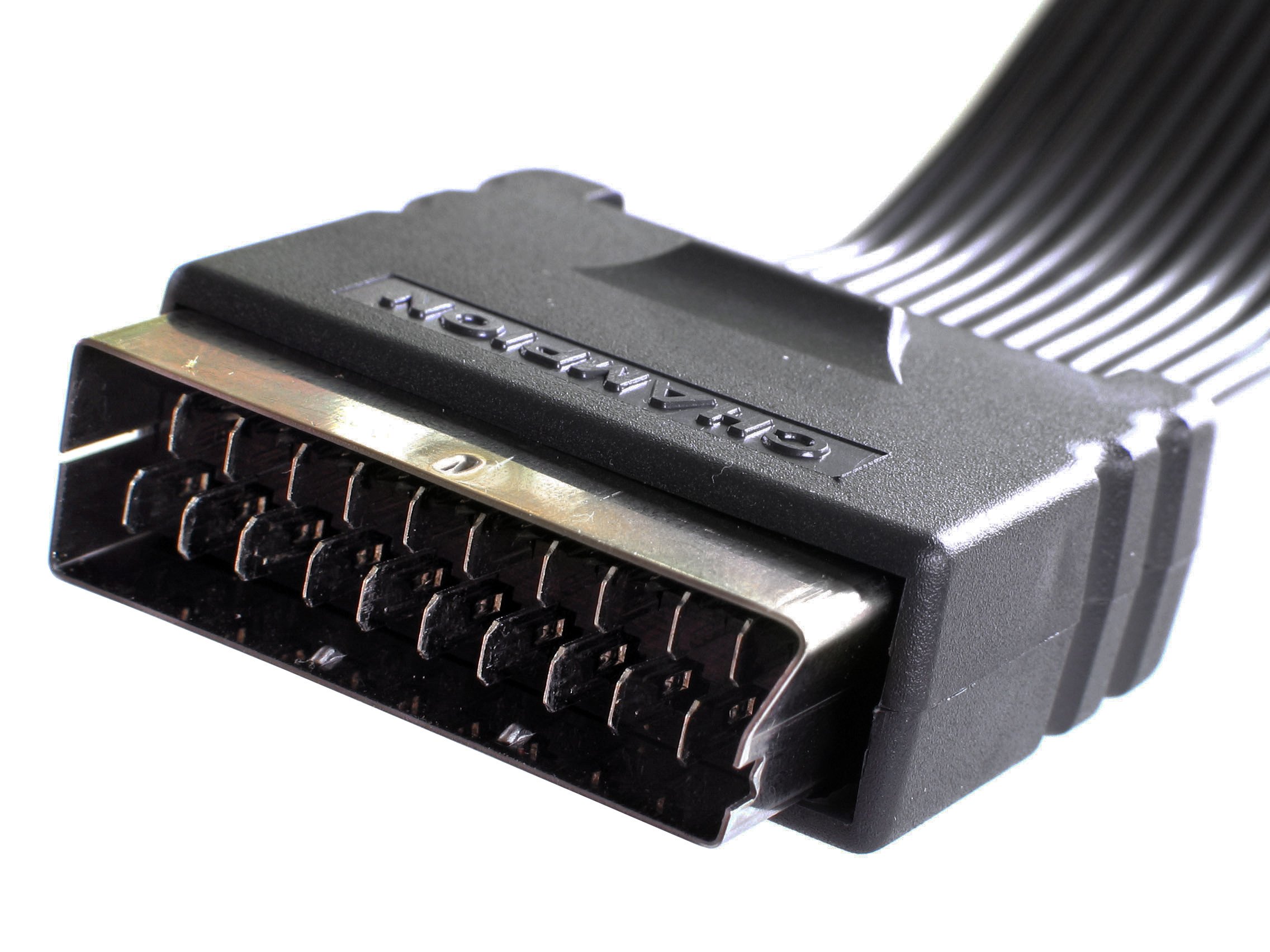
A 21-pin SCART or JP21 connector for a television

The various RGB (red, green, blue) analog component video standards (e.g., RGBS, RGBHV, RGsB) use no compression and impose no real limit on color depth or resolution, but require large bandwidth to carry the signal and contain a lot of redundant data since each channel typically includes much of the same black-and-white image. Early personal computers such as the IBM PS/2 offered this signal via a VGA port. Many televisions, especially in Europe, can utilize RGB via the SCART connector.

In addition to the red, green and blue color signals, RGB requires two additional signals to synchronize the video display. Several methods are used:

- Composite sync, where the horizontal and vertical signals are mixed together on a separate wire (the S in RGBS)
- Separate sync, where the horizontal and vertical are each on their own wire (the H and V in RGBHV; also the acronym HD/VD, meaning horizontal deflection/vertical deflection, is used)
- Sync on green, where a composite sync signal is overlaid on the wire used to transport the green signal (SoG, Sync on G, or RGsB).
- Sync on red or sync on blue, where a composite sync signal is overlaid on either the red or blue wire
- Sync on composite (not to be confused with composite sync), where the signal normally used for composite video is used alongside the RGB signal only for the purposes of sync.
- Sync on luma, where the Y signal from S-Video is used alongside the RGB signal only for the purposes of sync.

Composite sync is common in the European SCART connection scheme (using pins 17 [ground] and 19 [composite-out] or 20 [composite-in]). RGBS requires four wires – red, green, blue and sync. If separate cables are used, the sync cable is usually colored yellow (as is the standard for composite video) or white.

Separate sync is most common with VGA, used worldwide for analog computer monitors. This is sometimes known as RGBHV, as the horizontal and vertical synchronization pulses are sent in separate channels. This mode requires five conductors. If separate cables are used, the sync lines are usually yellow (H) and white (V), yellow (H) and black (V), or gray (H) and black (V).

Sync on Green (SoG) is less common, and while some VGA monitors support it, most do not. Sony is a big proponent of SoG, and most of their monitors (and their PlayStation line of video game consoles) use it. Like devices that use composite video or S-video, SoG devices require additional circuitry to remove the sync signal from the green line. A monitor that is not equipped to handle SoG will display an image with an extreme green tint, if any image at all, when given a SoG input.

Sync on red and sync on blue are even rarer than sync on green and are typically used only in certain specialized equipment.

Sync on composite, not to be confused with composite sync, is commonly used on devices that output both composite video and RGB over SCART. The RGB signal is used for color information, while the composite video signal is only used to extract the sync information. This is generally an inferior sync method, as this often causes checkerboards to appear on an image, but the image quality is still much sharper than standalone composite video.

Sync on luma is much similar to sync on composite but uses the Y signal from S-Video instead of a composite video signal. This is sometimes used on SCART since both composite video and S-Video luma ride along the same pins. This generally does not suffer from the same checkerboard issue as sync on composite, and is generally acceptable on devices that do not feature composite sync, such as the Sony PlayStation and some modded Nintendo 64 models.

=== Luma-based analog component video ===
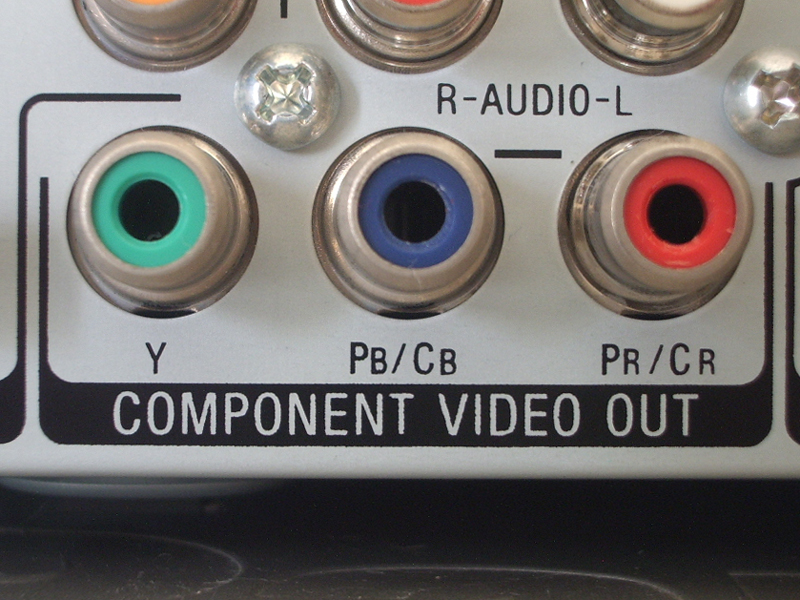
YP_{B}P_{R} component video out on a consumer electronics device, a Sony DVD player

Further types of component analog video signals do not use separate red, green and blue components but rather a colorless component, termed luma, which provides brightness information (as in black-and-white video). This combines with one or more color-carrying components, termed chroma, that give only color information. Both the S-Video component video output (two separate signals) and the YP_{B}P_{R} component video output (three separate signals) seen on DVD players are examples of this method.

Converting video into luma and chroma allows for chroma subsampling, a method used by JPEG and MPEG compression schemes to reduce the storage requirements for images and video (respectively).

Many consumer TVs, DVD players, monitors, video projectors and other video devices at one time used YP_{B}P_{R} output or input.

When used for connecting a video source to a video display where both support 4:3 and 16:9 display formats, the PAL television standard provides for signaling pulses that will automatically switch the display from one format to the other.

==== Connectors used ====
- D-Terminal: Used mostly on Japanese electronics.
- Three BNC (professional) or RCA connectors (consumer): Typically colored green (Y), blue (P_{B}) and red (P_{R}).
- SCART used in Europe.
- Video-in video-out (VIVO): 9-pin Mini-DIN-connectors called "TV Out" in computer video cards, which usually include an adaptor for component RCA, composite RCA and 4-pin S-Video Mini-DIN.

== Synchronization ==
Component video requires an extra synchronization signal to be sent along with the video. Component video sync signals can be sent in several different ways:

Separate sync
Uses separate wires for horizontal and vertical synchronization. When used in RGB (i.e. VGA) connections, five separate signals are sent (red, green, blue, horizontal sync, and vertical sync).
Composite sync
Combines horizontal and vertical synchronization onto one wire. When used in RGB connections, only four separate signals are sent (red, green, blue, and composite sync).
Sync-on-green (SOG)
Combines composite sync with the green signal in RGB. Only three signals are sent (red, green with sync, and blue). This synchronization system is used in, among other applications, many systems by Silicon Graphics and Sun Microsystems through a DB13W3 connector.
Sync-on-luminance
Similar to sync-on-green, but combines sync with the luminance signal (Y) of a color system such as YP_{B}P_{R} and S-Video. This is the synchronization system normally used in home theater systems.
Sync-on-composite
The connector carries a standard composite video signal along with the RGB components, for use with devices that cannot process RGB signals. For devices that do understand RGB, the sync component of that composite signal is used along with the color information from the RGB lines. This arrangement is found in the SCART connector in common use in Europe and some other PAL/SECAM areas.

== International standards ==
Examples of international component video standards are:

- YPbPr:
  - CEA-770.2 Standard Definition TV Analog Component Video Interface (480p, 480i)
  - CEA-770.3 High Definition TV Analog Component Video Interface (720p, 720i, 1080p)
- RGB:
  - STANAG 3350 Analogue Video Standard: adaptation of monochrome EIA/TIA/RS-343A signals to RGB use. Sync on green.
  - VGA connector RGBHV

== Component versus composite ==
In a composite signal, such as NTSC, PAL or SECAM, the luminance (Y) and chrominance (C) signals are encoded together into one signal. When the color components are kept as separate signals, the video is called component analog video (CAV), which requires three separate signals: the luminance signal (Y) and the color difference signals (R-Y and B-Y; Cb and Cr; etc.).

In composite video, quadrature amplitude modulation is used to merge a low-bandwidth chrominance color signal onto the luminance. The lower bandwidth gives it lower resolution and the mixing causes crosstalk artifacts. Since component video does not undergo the encoding process, the color quality is noticeably better than composite video.

Component video connectors are not unique in that the same connectors are used for several different standards; hence, making a component video connection often does not lead to a satisfactory video signal being transferred. Many DVD players and TVs may need to be set to indicate the type of input/output being used, and if set incorrectly the image may not be properly displayed. Progressive scan, for example, is often not enabled by default, even when component video output is selected.

== Digital component video ==
The ITU has defined via BT.601 and BT.656 standards, ways of saving standard-definition television footage (480i, 576i) digitally. They improve upon analogue transmission by cutting down the number of required wires as well as being more resistant to interference, but offer no improvements on resolution and frame rate. These encodings are called "digital component video": the component part referring to it maintaining the separation of luminance (Y) and chrominance (C) color channels much like in analogue component video.

More common today are formats that allow higher resolutions and frame rates.

- Digital Visual Interface (DVI), a system that uses four or eight TMDS twisted pairs, commonly used by computers and pre-HDMI entertainment systems.
- High-Definition Multimedia Interface (HDMI) for home theater systems and televisions, which can also be made to support digital rights management (DRM). It is derived from DVI and also uses TMDS. Supports high-dynamic-range television (HDR).
- DisplayPort (DP), a standard mainly found on computer monitors, uses four twisted pairs. It is royalty-free unlike HDMI, and has a DVI/HDMI compatible "dual-mode". Supports HDR and optional DRM.

Both HDMI and DP can support very high resolutions and frame rates such as 4320p@120, enabled by a combination of very high data rates (more than 70 Gbit/s) and Display Stream Compression. However, actual availability of these features depend on support from the output hardware (usually a graphics card or a disc player), the cable, and the display (monitor or television).

The demise of analog is largely due to screens moving to large flat digital panels as well as the desire for having a single cable for both audio and video, but also due to a slight loss of clarity when converting from a digital media source to analog and back again for a flat digital display, particularly when used at higher resolutions where analog signals are highly susceptible to noise.

== See also ==
- Coaxial cable
- F connector
- List of video connectors
