= Subcarrier =

Sideband of a radio frequency carrier wave

A subcarrier is a secondary carrier signal, derived from or frequency-related to a primary carrier, that is modulated to transmit additional information. Examples include the provision of colour in a black and white television system or the provision of stereo in a monophonic radio broadcast. There is no physical difference between a carrier and a subcarrier; the "sub" implies that it has been derived from a carrier, which has been amplitude modulated by a steady signal and has a constant frequency relation to it.

== FM stereo ==
Stereo broadcasting is made possible by using a subcarrier on FM radio stations, which takes the left channel and "subtracts" the right channel from it — essentially by hooking up the right-channel wires backward (reversing polarity) and then joining left and reversed-right. The result is modulated with suppressed carrier AM, more correctly called sum and difference modulation or SDM, at 38 kHz in the FM signal, which is joined at 2% modulation with the mono left+right audio (which ranges 50 Hz ~ 15 kHz).

Once the receiver demodulates the L+R and L−R signals, it adds the two signals ([L+R] + [L−R] = 2L) to get the left channel and subtracts ([L+R] − [L−R] = 2R) to get the right channel. Rather than having a local oscillator, the 19 kHz pilot tone provides an in-phase reference signal used to reconstruct the missing carrier wave from the 38 kHz signal.

=== FM Pilot subcarrier ===
A 19 kHz pilot tone added at a 9% modulation to trigger radios to decode the stereo subcarrier, making FM stereo fully compatible with mono.

=== FM Stereophonic Subcarrier ===
The second harmonic of the pilot subcarrier, modulated with the difference of the left and right signals (L - R), suppressed to 40 dB below the carrier level.

=== FM Multiplex subcarrier ===
A subcarrier within the frequency range of 20-99 kHz of the FM baseband, and modulated with additional information.

For AM broadcasting, different analog (AM stereo) and digital (HD Radio) methods are used to produce stereophonic audio. Modulated subcarriers of the type used in FM broadcasting are impractical for AM broadcast due to the relatively narrow signal bandwidth allocated for a given AM signal. On standard AM broadcast radios, the entire 9 kHz to 10 kHz allocated bandwidth of the AM signal may be used for audio.

== Television ==
Likewise, analog TV signals are transmitted with the black and white luminance part as the main signal, and the color chrominance as the subcarriers. A black and white TV simply ignores the extra information, as it has no decoder for it. To reduce the bandwidth of the color subcarriers, they are filtered to remove higher frequencies. This is made possible by the fact that the human eye sees much more detail in contrast than in color. In addition, only blue and red are transmitted, with green being determined by subtracting the other two from the luminance and taking the remainder. (See: YIQ, YCbCr, YPbPr) Various broadcast television systems use different subcarrier frequencies, in addition to differences in encoding.

For the audio part, MTS uses subcarriers on the video that can also carry three audio channels, including one for stereo (same left-minus-right method as for FM), another for second audio programs (such as descriptive video service for the vision-impaired, and bilingual programs), and yet a third hidden one for the studio to communicate with reporters or technicians in the field (or for a technician or broadcast engineer at a remote transmitter site to talk back to the studio), or any other use a TV station might see fit. (See also NICAM, A2 Stereo.)

In RF-transmitted composite video, subcarriers remain in the baseband signal after main carrier demodulation to be separated in the receiver. The mono audio component of the transmitted signal is in a separate carrier and not integral to the video component. In wired video connections, composite video retains the integrated subcarrier signal structure found in the transmitted baseband signal, while S-Video places the chrominance and luminance signals on separate wires to eliminate subcarrier crosstalk and enhance the signal bandwidth and strength (picture sharpness and brightness).

== Private audio ==
Before satellite, Muzak and similar services were transmitted to department stores on FM subcarriers. The fidelity of the subcarrier audio was limited compared to the primary FM radio audio channel. The United States Federal Communications Commission (FCC) also allowed betting parlors in New York state to get horse racing results from the state gaming commission via the same technology.

Many non-commercial educational FM stations in the US (especially public radio stations affiliated with NPR) broadcast a radio reading service for the blind, which reads articles in local newspapers and sometimes magazines. The vision-impaired can request a special radio, permanently tuned to receive audio on a particular subcarrier frequency (usually 67 kHz or 92 kHz), from a particular FM station.

Services like these and others on broadcast FM subcarriers are referred to as a Subsidiary Communications Authority (SCA) service by the FCC in the United States, and as Subsidiary Communications Multiplex Operations (SCMO) by the Canadian Radio-television and Telecommunications Commission (CRTC) in Canada.

== Datacasting ==
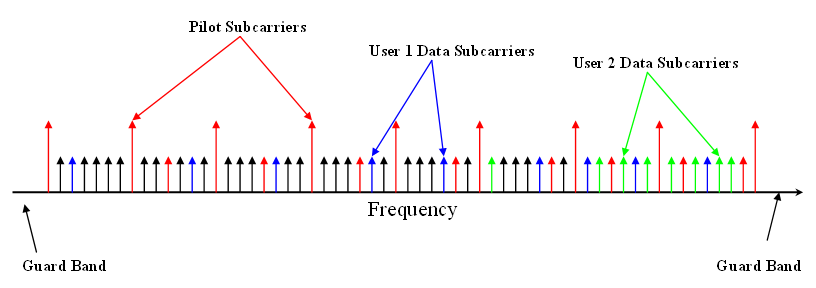
Subcarries in the OFDMA scheme

The RDS/RBDS subcarrier (57 kHz) allows FM radios to display what station they are on, pick another frequency on the same network or with the same format, scroll brief messages like station slogans, news, weather, or traffic—even activate pagers or remote billboards. It can also broadcast EAS messages, and has a station "format" name ALERT to automatically trigger radios to tune in for emergency info, even if a CD is playing. While it never really caught on in North America, European stations frequently rely on this system. (Note: The radio station Heart FM used this service to cause people's radio sets to switch over to adverts for commercial vehicles during the morning and evening rush hours) An upgraded version is built into digital radio.

xRDS is a system with which broadcasters can multiply the speed of data transmission in the FM channel by using further normal RDS subcarriers, shifted into the higher frequencies of the FM multiplex. The extra RDS subcarriers are placed in the upper empty part of the multiplex spectrum and carry the extra data payload. xRDS has no fixed frequencies for the additional subcarriers.

Until 2012, MSN Direct used subcarriers to transmit traffic, gas prices, movie times, weather and other information to GPS navigation devices, wristwatches, and other devices. Many of the subcarriers were from stations owned by Clear Channel. The technology was known as DirectBand.

FMeXtra on FM uses dozens of small COFDM subcarriers to transmit digital radio in a fully in-band on-channel manner. Removing other analog subcarriers (such as stereo) increases either the audio quality or channels available, the latter making it possible to send non-audio metadata along with it, such as album covers, song lyrics, artist info, concert data, and more.

== Telemetry and foldback ==
Many stations use subcarriers for internal purposes, such as getting telemetry back from a remote transmitter, often located in a difficult-to-access area at the top of a mountain. A station's engineer can carry a decoder around with them and know anything that is wrong, as long as the station is on the air and they are within range. This is the essence of a Wireless transmitter/studio link.

On wireless studio/transmitter links (STLs), not only are the broadcast station's subcarriers transmitted, but other remote control commands as well.

Interruptible foldback, such as for remote broadcasting, is also possible over subcarriers, though its role is limited.

== MCPC satellites ==
Analog satellite television and terrestrial analog microwave relay communications rely on subcarriers transmitted with the video carrier on a satellite transponder or microwave channel for the audio channels of a video feed. There are usually at frequencies of 5.8, 6.2, or 6.8 MHz (the video carrier usually resides below 5 MHz on a satellite transponder or microwave relay). Extra subcarriers are sometimes transmitted at around 7 or 8 MHz for extra audio (such as radio stations) or low-to-medium-speed data. This is referred to as multiple channel per carrier (MCPC).

This is now mostly superseded by digital TV (usually DVB-S, DVB-S2 or another MPEG-2-based system), where audio and video data are packaged together (multiplexed) in a single MPEG transport stream.

== See also ==
- Subsidiary Communications Authority (SCA)
- xRDS
