= YPbPr =

Color space used in analog video

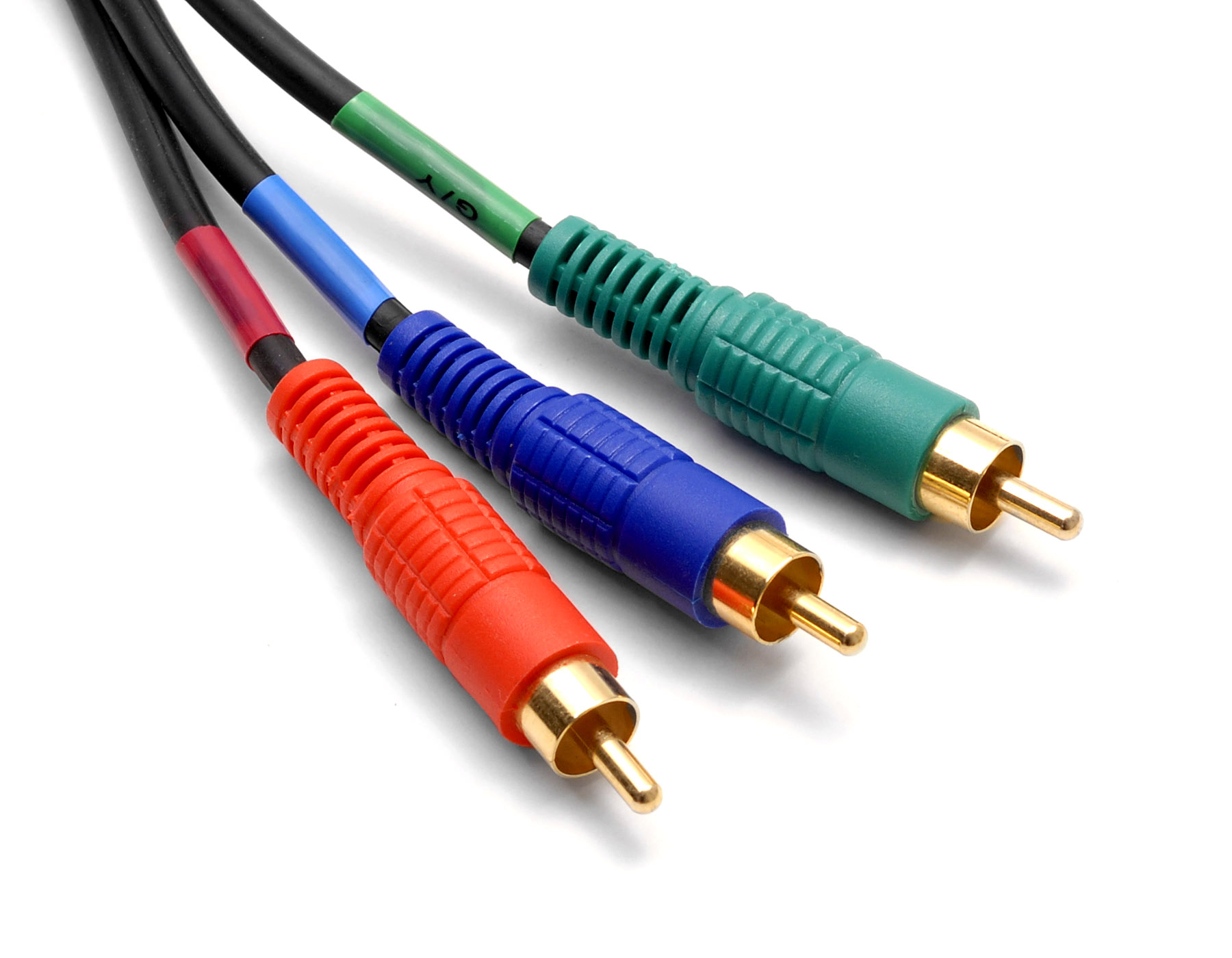
YPbPr is the analog video signal carried by component video cable in consumer electronics. The green cable carries Y, the blue cable carries P_{B} and the red cable carries P_{R}.

YPbPr or Y'PbPr, also written as YP_{B}P_{R}, is a color space used in video electronics, in particular in reference to component video cables. Like YC_{B}C_{R}, it is based on gamma corrected RGB primaries; the two are numerically equivalent but YP_{B}P_{R} is designed for use in analog systems while YC_{B}C_{R} is intended for digital video. The prime symbol indicates presence of gamma correction.

YP_{B}P_{R} is commonly referred to as component video by manufacturers; however, there are many types of component video, most of which are some form of RGB. Some video cards come with video-in video-out (VIVO) ports for connecting to component video devices.

== History ==
When color signals were first added to the NTSC-encoded black and white video standard, the hue was represented by a phase shift of a color reference sub-carrier. The "P" for phase information or phase shift has carried through to represent color information even in the case where there is no longer a phase shift used to represent hue. Thus, the YP_{B}P_{R} nomenclature derives from engineering metrics developed for the NTSC color standard.

== Usage ==
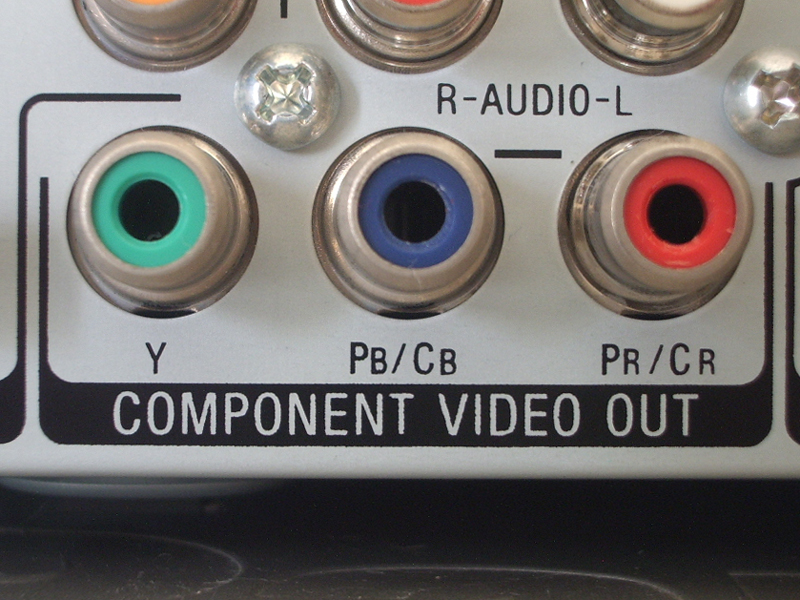
Female RCA connectors used to output YPbPr component video from a set-top-box, DVD player or similar device. Female connections in this configuration are also used for YPbPr inputs on display devices such as TVs.

The same cables can be used for YP_{B}P_{R} and composite video. This means that the yellow, red, and white RCA connector cables commonly packaged with most audio/visual equipment can be used in place of the YP_{B}P_{R} connectors, provided the end user is careful to connect each cable to corresponding components at both ends. Also, many TVs use the green connection either for luma only or for composite video input. Since YP_{B}P_{R} is backward compatible with the luminance portion of composite video even with just component video decoding one can still use composite video via this input, but only luma information will be displayed, along with the chroma dots. The same goes the other way around so long as 480i or 576i is used.

Signals using YP_{B}P_{R} offer enough separation that no color multiplexing is needed, so the quality of the extracted image is nearly identical to the pre-encoded signal. S-Video and composite video mix the signals together by means of electronic multiplexing. Signal degradation is typical for composite video, as most display systems are unable to completely separate the signals, though HDTVs tend to perform such separation better than most CRT units (see dot crawl). S-Video can mitigate some of these potential issues, as its luma is transmitted separately from chroma.

Among consumer analog interfaces, only YP_{B}P_{R} and analog RGB component video are capable of carrying non-interlaced video and resolutions higher than 480i or 576i, up to 1080p.

=== Related color models ===
The scope of the terms Y′UV, YUV, YCbCr, YPbPr, etc., is sometimes ambiguous and overlapping.

- Y′UV is the separation used in PAL.
- YDbDr is the format used in SECAM, unusually based on non-gamma-corrected (linear) RGB, making the Y component true luminance.
- Y'IQ is the separation used in NTSC television.
- Y'PbPr is any separation used in analogue component video, derived by converting the phase (P) television signal into amplitude.
- Y'CbCr is any digital encoding of Y'PbPr suited for video and image compression and transmission formats such as MPEG and JPEG.
- Y'CoCg is a similar separation that offers better performance and lossless round-tripping, used in newer video codecs and JPEG XR.

All these formats are based on a luma component and two chroma components describing the color difference from gray. In all formats other than Y′IQ, each chroma component is a scaled version of the difference between red/blue and Y; the main difference lies in the scaling factors used, which is determined by color primaries and the intended numeric range (compare the use of U_{max} and V_{max} in § SDTV with BT.470 with a fixed 1/2 in YCbCr § R'G'B' to Y'PbPr). In Y′IQ, the UV plane is rotated by 33°.

== Technical details ==
The definition of Y'PbPr is coupled to its cognate color television standard. The conversion is conceptually very similar, except with the final steps of phase conversion and signal merging omitted.

Y'PbPr can be derived from a gamma corrected R'G'B' signal with a typical range of 0-700 mV. The first step is converting to Y', R'-Y' and B'-Y' using the correct conversion factors:

$Y'$ carries luma (brightness or luminance) and synchronization (sync) information. Luma is defined as:

- $Y' = 0.212 R' + 0.701 G' + 0.087 B'$ for Hi-Vision;
- $Y' = 0.2126 R' + 0.7152 G' + 0.0722 B'$ for HDTV;
- $Y' = 0.299 R' + 0.587 G' + 0.114 B'$ for SDTV;

$R'-Y'$ and $B'-Y'$, like their names suggest, are simply obtained by subtracting the calculated luma from the red and blue values.

These $R'-Y'$ and $B'-Y'$ values are then scaled to obtain normalized $P_b'$ and $P_r'$ values in the range of +/- 350 or 0-700 mV:

- $P_b' = (B'-Y')/1.826$ and $P_r' = (R'-Y')/1.576$ for Hi-Vision;
- $P_b' = [0.5/(1-0.0722)](B'-Y')$ and $P_r' = [0.5/(1-0.2126)](R'-Y')$ for HDTV;
- $P_b' = 0.564(B'-Y')$ and $P_r' = 0.713(R'-Y')$ for SDTV.

Alternatively all three output values $[Y' P_b' P_r']^\intercal$ can be represented as the result of multiplying $[R' G' B']^\intercal$ with a 3×3 conversion matrix. These formula are based on SMPTE 240M (240M defined EOTF and uses SMPTE 170M primaries and white point) for Hi-Vision; BT.601 matrix for 525 lines (SMPTE 273M) and 625 lines (ITU-R BT.1358) for SDTV; and SMPTE 274M and SMPTE 296M for HDTV. Different standards often have different matrices.

The following table lists example YP_{B}P_{R} values for black, 50% gray and full intensity colors, as defined in ITU-R Recommendation BT.1729:

Example YP_{B}P_{R} signal values for SD and HDTV systems
SD				HD			
Color	Y (mV)	Pb (mV)	Pr (mV)	Color	Y (mV)	Pb (mV)	Pr (mV)
Black	0.0	350.0	350.0	Black	0.0	350.0	350.0
Gray	350.0	350.0	350.0	Gray	350.0	350.0	350.0
White	700.0	350.0	350.0	White	700.0	350.0	350.0
Yellow	620.2	0.0	406.9	Yellow	649.5	0.0	382.1
Cyan	490.7	468.1	0.0	Cyan	551.2	430.2	0.0
Green	410.9	118.3	57.0	Green	500.6	80.2	32.1
Magenta	289.1	581.9	643.1	Magenta	199.4	619.8	667.9
Red	209.3	231.9	700.0	Red	148.8	269.8	700.0
Blue	79.8	700.0	293.1	Blue	50.5	700.0	317.9

To send a green signal as a fourth component is redundant, as it can be derived using the blue, red and luma information.

The EOTF (gamma correction) may be different from common sRGB EOTF and BT.1886 EOTF. Sync is carried on the Y channel and is a bi-level sync signal, but in HD formats a tri-level sync is used and is typically carried on all channels.

== See also ==
Graphic chipsets that generate color internally based on YP_{B}P_{R}:

- CTIA and GTIA
- MOS Technology TED
- TMS9918
- Motorola 6847
