= Georges Valensi =

M. Georges Valensi (1889–1980) was a French telecommunications engineer who, in 1938, invented and patented a method of transmitting color images via luma and chrominance so that they could be received on both color and black & white television sets. Rival color television methods, which had been in development since the 1920s, were incompatible with monochrome televisions.

Valensi was an official of CCIF serving first as Secretary-General (1923–1948) and then as Director (1949–1956).

All current widely deployed color television broadcast standards – NTSC, SECAM, PAL and today's digital standards, and importantly digital image data compression – implement some form of his idea of reducing a signal to a separate luminance with chrominance encoded separately. The original patents expired in 1962.
