= YIQ =

Color space

The YIQ color space at Y=0.5. Note that the I and Q chroma coordinates are scaled up to 1.0. See the formulae below in the article to get the right bounds.

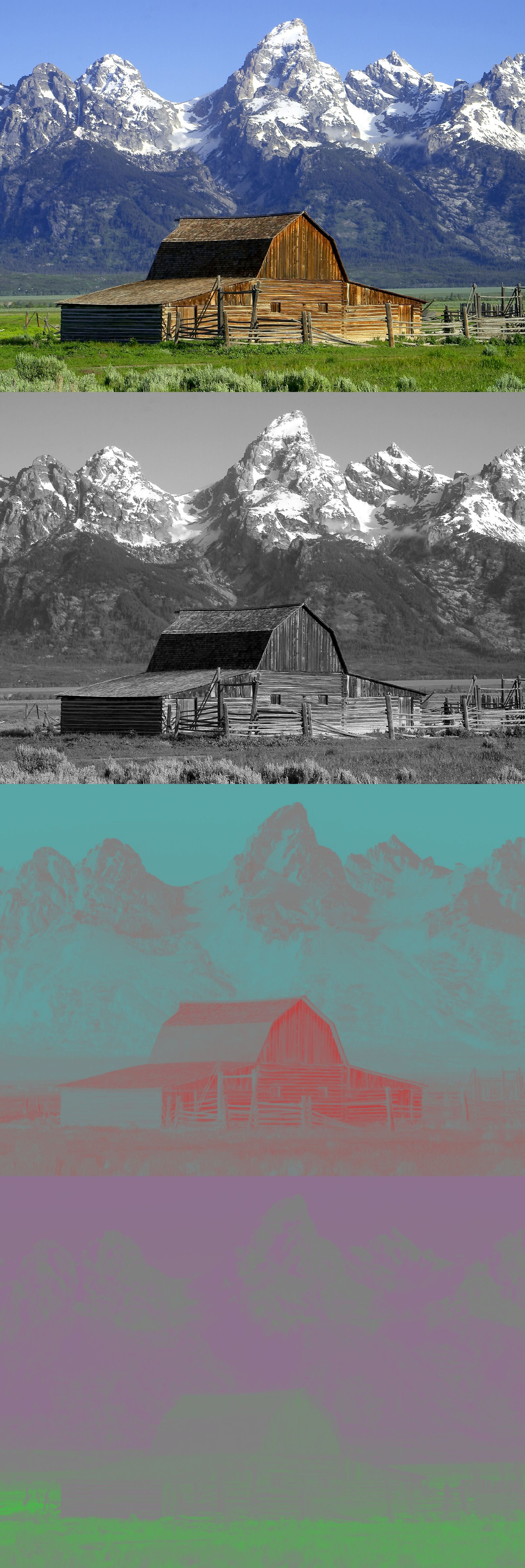
An image along with its Y, I, and Q components

YIQ is the color space used by the analog NTSC color TV system. I stands for in-phase, while Q stands for quadrature, referring to the components used in quadrature amplitude modulation. Other TV systems used different color spaces, such as YUV for PAL or YDbDr for SECAM. Later digital standards use the YCbCr color space. These color spaces are all broadly related, and work based on the principle of adding a color component named chrominance, to a black and white image named luma.

In YIQ the Y component represents the luma information, and is the only component used by black-and-white television receivers. I and Q represent the chrominance information, with I indicating (roughly) orange-blue contrast, and Q indicating purple-green contrast. I and Q can be thought of as a second pair of axes on the same graph as the YUV color space, rotated 33°; therefore IQ and UV represent different coordinate systems on the same plane.

The YIQ system is intended to take advantage of human color-response characteristics. The eye is more sensitive to changes in the orange-blue (I) range than in the purple-green range (Q)—therefore less bandwidth is required for Q than for I. Broadcast NTSC limits I to 1.3 MHz and Q to 0.4 MHz. I and Q are frequency interleaved into the 4 MHz Y signal, which keeps the bandwidth of the overall signal down to 4.2 MHz. In YUV systems, since U and V both contain information in the orange-blue range, both components must be given the same amount of bandwidth as I to achieve similar color fidelity.

Very few television sets perform true I and Q decoding, due to the high costs of such an implementation. Compared to the cheaper R-Y and B-Y decoding which requires only one filter, I and Q each requires a different filter to satisfy the bandwidth differences between I and Q. These bandwidth differences also require that the 'I' filter include a time delay to match the longer delay of the 'Q' filter. The Rockwell Modular Digital Radio (MDR) was one I and Q decoding set, which in 1997 could operate in frame-at-a-time mode with a PC or in realtime with the Fast IQ Processor (FIQP). Some RCA "Colortrak" home TV receivers made circa 1985 not only used I/Q decoding, but also advertised its benefits along with its comb filtering benefits as full "100 percent processing" to deliver more of the original color picture content. Earlier, more than one brand of color TV (RCA, Arvin) used I/Q decoding in the 1954 or 1955 model year on models utilizing screens about 13 inches (measured diagonally). The original Advent projection television used I/Q decoding. Around 1990, at least one manufacturer (Ikegami) of professional studio picture monitors advertised I/Q decoding.

== Image processing ==
The YIQ representation is sometimes employed in color image processing transformations. For example, applying a histogram equalization directly to the channels in an RGB image would alter the color balance of the image. Instead, the histogram equalization is applied to the Y channel of the YIQ or YUV representation of the image, which only normalizes the brightness levels of the image.

== Formulas ==
These formulas allow conversion between YIQ and RGB color spaces, where R, G, and B are gamma-corrected values. Values for the original 1953 NTSC colorimetry and later SMPTE C FCC standard.

The following formulas assume:

$$R, G, B, Y \in \left[ 0, 1 \right], \quad I \in \left[-0.5957, 0.5957\right], \quad Q \in \left[-0.5226, 0.5226\right]$$

The ranges for I and Q are a result of the coefficients in the 2nd and 3rd rows of the RGB-to-YIQ equation matrix below, respectively.

=== NTSC 1953 colorimetry ===
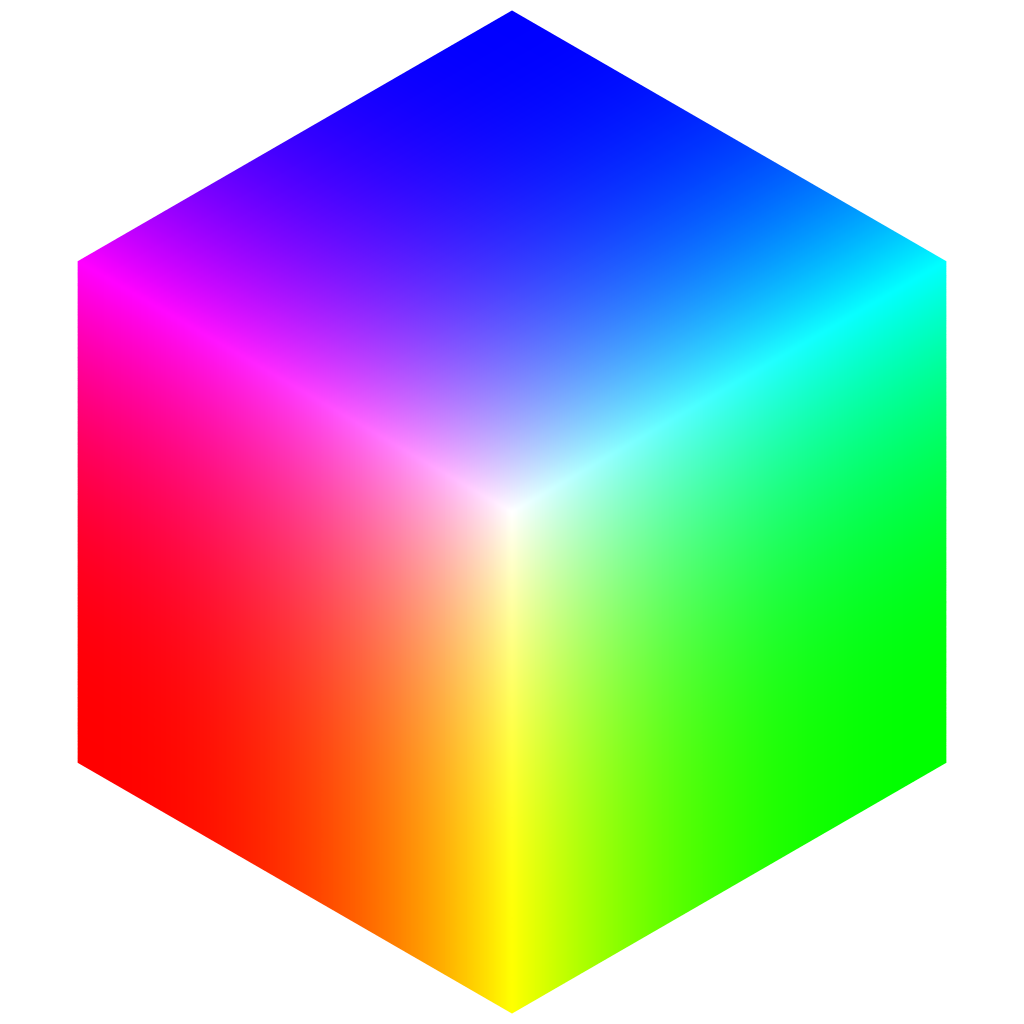
NTSC 1953 colorimetry color cube (color profile encoded, requires a compatible browser and monitor for accurate display).

These formulas approximate the conversion between the original 1953 color NTSC specification and YIQ.

==== From RGB to YIQ ====
$$\begin{bmatrix} Y \\ I \\ Q \end{bmatrix}
\approx
\begin{bmatrix}
0.299 &  0.587 &  0.114 \\
0.5959 & -0.2746 & -0.3213 \\
0.2115 & -0.5227 &  0.3112
\end{bmatrix}
\begin{bmatrix} R \\ G \\ B \end{bmatrix}$$

==== From YIQ to RGB ====
$$\begin{bmatrix} R \\ G \\ B \end{bmatrix}
=
\begin{bmatrix}
1 &  0.956 &  0.619 \\
1 & -0.272 & -0.647 \\
1 & -1.106 &  1.703
\end{bmatrix}
\begin{bmatrix} Y \\ I \\ Q \end{bmatrix}$$

Note that the top row is identical to that of the YUV color space

- $$\begin{bmatrix} R \\ G \\ B \end{bmatrix} = \begin{bmatrix} 1 \\ 1 \\ 1 \end{bmatrix} \implies \begin{bmatrix} Y \\ I \\ Q \end{bmatrix} = \begin{bmatrix} 1 \\ 0 \\ 0 \end{bmatrix}$$

=== FCC NTSC Standard (SMPTE C) ===
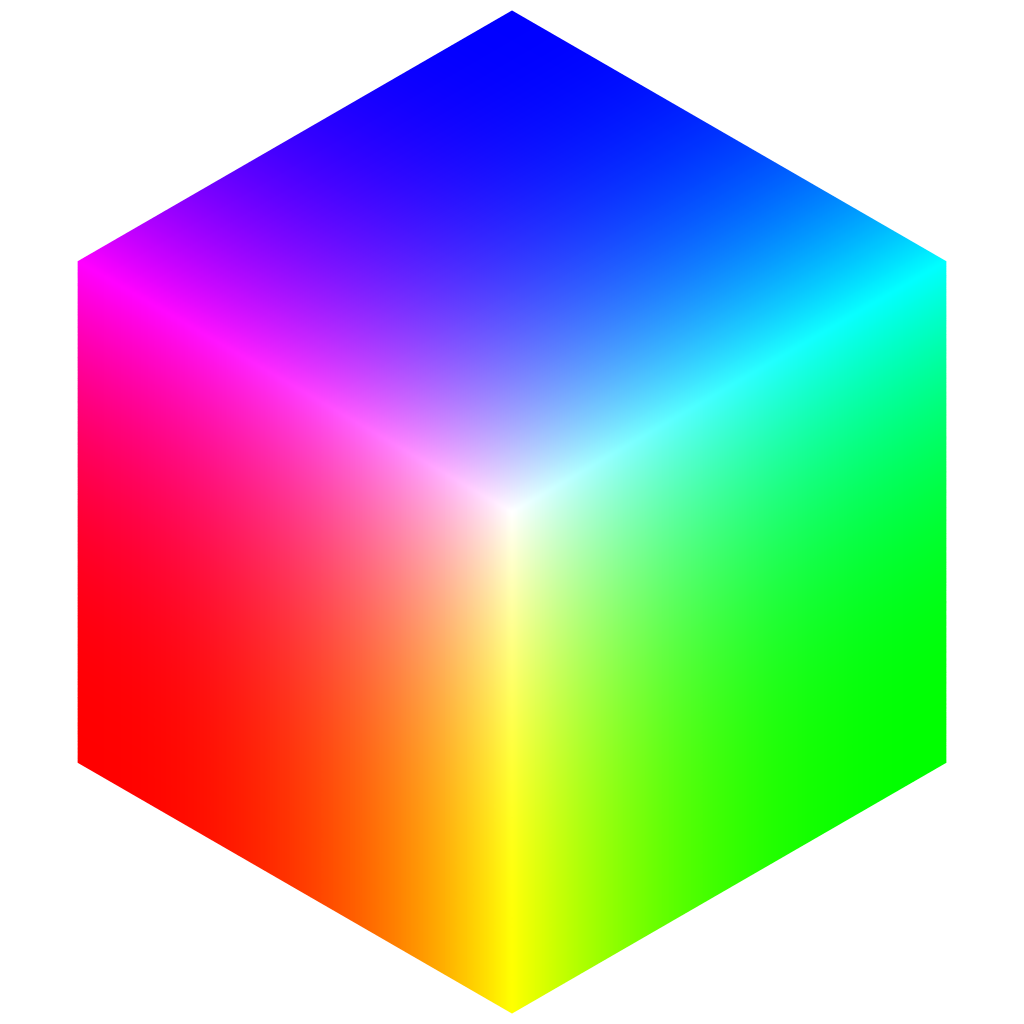
SMPTE C color cube (color profile encoded, requires a compatible browser and monitor for accurate display).

In 1987, the Society of Motion Picture and Television Engineers (SMPTE) Committee on Television Technology, Working Group on Studio Monitor Colorimetry, adopted the SMPTE C. The previous conversion formulas were deprecated, and the NTSC standard contained in the FCC rules for over-the-air analog color TV broadcasting adopted a different matrix:

==== From RGB to YIQ ====
$$\left \{
\begin{array}{ccl}
E_Y^\prime&=&0.30E_R^\prime+0.59E_G^\prime+0.11E_B^\prime\\
E_I^\prime&=&-0.27(E_B^\prime-E_Y^\prime)+0.74(E_R^\prime-E_Y^\prime)\\
E_Q^\prime&=&0.41(E_B^\prime-E_Y^\prime)+0.48(E_R^\prime-E_Y^\prime)
\end{array}
\right .$$

in matrix notation, that equation system is written as:

$$\begin{bmatrix} E_Y^\prime \\ E_I^\prime \\ E_Q^\prime \end{bmatrix}
=
\begin{bmatrix}
0.30    &  0.59    &   0.11 \\
0.599   & -0.2773  &  -0.3217 \\
0.213   & -0.5251 &    0.3121
\end{bmatrix}
\begin{bmatrix} E_R^\prime \\ E_G^\prime \\ E_B^\prime \end{bmatrix}$$

Where:

- $E_Y^\prime$ is the gamma-corrected voltage of luma.
- $E_R^\prime$, $E_G^\prime$ and $E_B^\prime$ are the gamma-corrected voltages corresponding to red, green, and blue signals.
- $E_I^\prime$ and $E_Q^\prime$ are the amplitudes of the orthogonal components of the chrominance signal.

==== From YIQ to RGB ====
To convert from FCC YIQ to RGB:

$$\left \{
\begin{array}{ccl}
E_R^\prime = E_Y^\prime + 0.9469 E_I^\prime + 0.6236 E_Q^\prime\\
E_G^\prime = E_Y^\prime - 0.2748 E_I^\prime - 0.6357 E_Q^\prime\\
E_B^\prime = E_Y^\prime - 1.1 E_I^\prime + 1.7 E_Q^\prime
\end{array}
\right .$$

in matrix notation, that equation system is written as:

$$\begin{bmatrix} E_R^\prime \\ E_G^\prime \\ E_B^\prime \end{bmatrix}
=
\begin{bmatrix}
1    &  0.9469    &   0.6236 \\
1   & -0.2748  &  -0.6357 \\
1   & -1.1000 &    1.7000
\end{bmatrix}
\begin{bmatrix} E_Y^\prime \\ E_I^\prime \\ E_Q^\prime \end{bmatrix}$$

Where:

- $E_Y^\prime$ is the gamma-corrected voltage of luma.
- $E_R^\prime$, $E_G^\prime$ and $E_B^\prime$ are the gamma-corrected voltages corresponding to red, green, and blue signals.
- $E_I^\prime$ and $E_Q^\prime$ are the amplitudes of the orthogonal components of the chrominance signal.

==== From YUV to YIQ and vice versa ====
$$\begin{bmatrix} Y' \\ I \\ Q \end{bmatrix}
=
\begin{bmatrix} 1 & 0 & 0 \\ 0 & -\sin(33^\circ) & \cos(33^\circ) \\ 0 & \cos(33^\circ) & \sin(33^\circ) \end{bmatrix}
\begin{bmatrix} Y' \\ U \\ V \end{bmatrix}
\approx
\begin{bmatrix} 1 & 0 & 0 \\ 0 & -0.54464 & 0.83867 \\ 0 & 0.83867 & 0.54464 \end{bmatrix}
\begin{bmatrix} Y' \\ U \\ V \end{bmatrix}$$

Due to orthogonal symmetry (symmetry is not required or enough) of the matrix the same matrix can be used for YIQ to YUV conversion.

== Phase-out ==
Most NTSC territories have switched over to digital television. For broadcasting in the United States, NTSC (and with it, YIQ) remained in use only for low-power television stations as of July 2011, well after full-power analog transmissions was ended by the Federal Communications Commission (FCC) on June 12, 2009, however these were also required to be shut down by the FCC on July 13, 2021, thereby ending the use of NTSC (and YIQ for that matter) completely in that region.
