= Chrominance =

Colour in an image or video

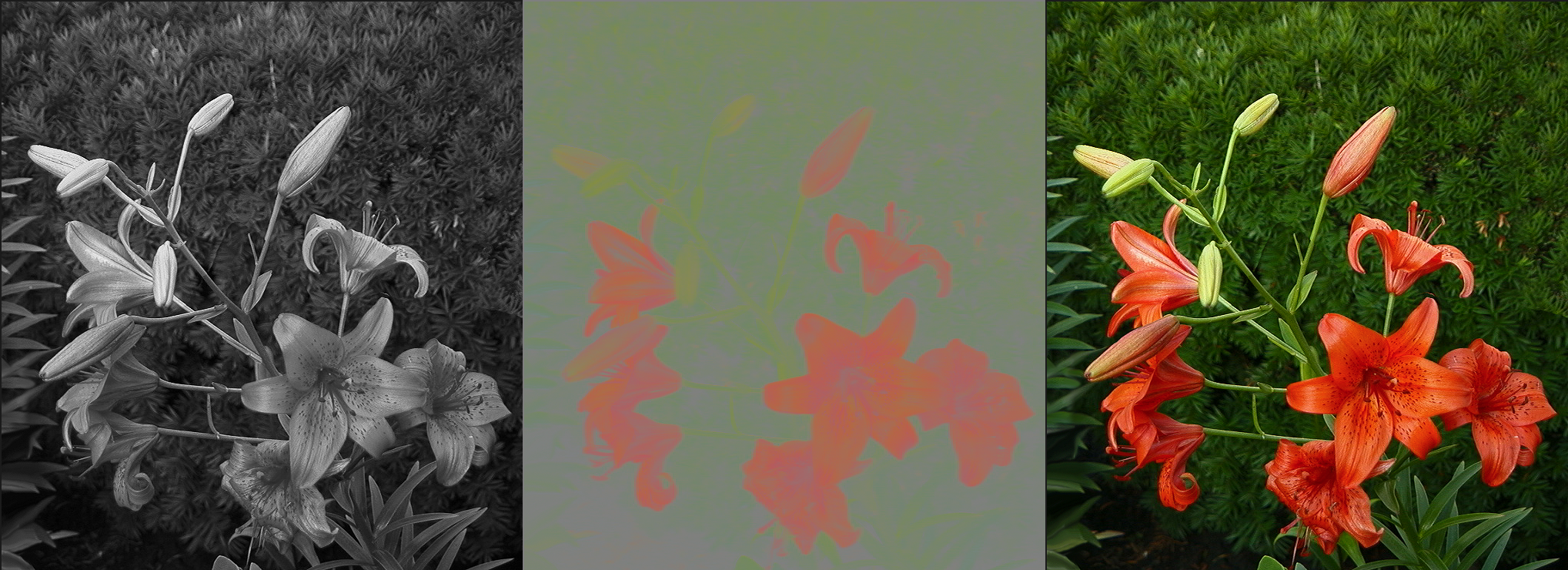
Three copies of the same image of orange flowers, with luma only on the left, chrominance only on the center, and full color image on the right.

Chrominance (C for short), or simply chroma, is the signal used in video systems to convey the color information of the picture (see YUV color model), separately from the accompanying luma signal (or Y' for short). Chrominance is usually represented as two color-difference components: U = B′ − Y′ (blue − luma) and V = R′ − Y′ (red − luma). Each of these different components may have scale factors and offsets applied to it, as specified by the applicable video standard.

In composite video signals, the U and V signals modulate a color subcarrier signal, and the result is referred to as the chrominance signal; the phase and amplitude of this modulated chrominance signal correspond approximately to the hue and saturation of the color. In digital-video and still-image color spaces such as Y′CbCr, the luma and chrominance components are digital sample values.

Separating RGB color signals into luma and chrominance allows the bandwidth of each to be determined separately. Typically, the chrominance bandwidth is reduced in analog composite video by reducing the bandwidth of a modulated color subcarrier, and in digital systems by chroma subsampling.

== History ==
The idea of transmitting a color television signal with distinct luma and chrominance components originated with Georges Valensi, who patented the idea in 1938. Valensi's patent application described:

The use of two channels, one transmitting the predominating color (signal T), and the other the mean brilliance (signal t) output from a single television transmitter to be received not only by color television receivers provided with the necessary more expensive equipment, but also by the ordinary type of television receiver which is more numerous and less expensive and which reproduces the pictures in black and white only.

Previous schemes for color television systems, which were incompatible with existing monochrome receivers, transmitted RGB signals in various ways.

== Television standards ==
In analog television, chrominance is encoded into a video signal using a subcarrier frequency. Depending on the video standard, the chrominance subcarrier may be either quadrature-amplitude-modulated (NTSC and PAL) or frequency-modulated (SECAM).

In the PAL system, the color subcarrier is 4.43 MHz above the video carrier, while in the NTSC system it is 3.58 MHz above the video carrier. The NTSC and PAL standards are the most commonly used, although there are other video standards that employ different subcarrier frequencies. For example, PAL-M (Brazil) uses a 3.58 MHz subcarrier, and SECAM uses two different frequencies, 4.250 MHz and 4.40625 MHz above the video carrier.

The presence of chrominance in a video signal is indicated by a color burst signal transmitted on the back porch, just after horizontal synchronization and before each line of video starts. If the color burst signal were visible on a television screen, it would appear as a vertical strip of a very dark olive color. In NTSC and PAL, hue is represented by a phase shift of the chrominance signal relative to the color burst, while saturation is determined by the amplitude of the subcarrier. In SECAM (R′ − Y′) and (B′ − Y′) signals are transmitted alternately and phase does not matter.

Chrominance is represented by the U-V color plane in PAL and SECAM video signals, and by the I-Q color plane in NTSC.

== Digital systems ==
Digital video and digital still photography systems sometimes use a luma/chroma decomposition for improved compression. For example, when an ordinary RGB digital image is compressed via the JPEG standard, the RGB color space is first converted (by a rotation matrix) to a YCbCr color space, because the three components in that space have less correlation redundancy and because the chrominance components can then be subsampled by a factor of 2 or 4 to further compress the image. On decompression, the Y′CbCr space is rotated back to RGB.

== See also ==
- Chroma subsampling
- Luma (video)
