= Purolator =

Purolator may refer to:

== Organizations ==
- Purolator Inc., a Canadian courier company
  - Purolator International, its American subsidiary
- Purolator Filters, an American automotive filter manufacturer (former corporate parent of the courier company)

== Racing ==
- Purolator 500, former name of a NASCAR race at Pocono Raceway from 1974 to 1976 now the Explore the Pocono Mountains 350
- Purolator 500, former name of a NASCAR race at Atlanta Motor Speedway from 1994 to 1996 now the Quaker State 400 (Atlanta)
