= 1989 Budweiser 500 =

11th race of the 1989 NASCAR Winston Cup Series

Race details
- Race 11 of 29 in the 1989 NASCAR Winston Cup Series
- The 1989 Budweiser 500 program cover, featuring Terry Labonte.
- Date: June 4, 1989
- Official name: 21st Annual Budweiser 500
- Location: Dover, Delaware, Dover Downs International Speedway
- Course: Permanent racing facility
- Course length: 1 miles (1.6 km)
- Distance: 500 laps, 500 mi (804.672 km)
- Scheduled distance: 500 laps, 500 mi (804.672 km)
- Average speed: 121.67 miles per hour (195.81 km/h)
- Attendance: 66,000

Pole position
Driver	Mark Martin	Roush Racing
- Time: 24.933

Most laps led
Driver	Dale Earnhardt	Richard Childress Racing
- Laps: 456

Winner
No. 3	Dale Earnhardt	Richard Childress Racing

Television in the United States
- Network: ESPN
- Announcers: Bob Jenkins, Ned Jarrett, Benny Parsons

Radio in the United States
- Radio: Motor Racing Network

The 1989 Budweiser 500 was the 11th stock car race of the 1989 NASCAR Winston Cup Series season and the 21st iteration of the event. The race was held on Sunday, June 4, 1989, before an audience of 66,000 in Dover, Delaware at Dover Downs International Speedway, a 1-mile (1.6 km) permanent oval-shaped racetrack. The race took the scheduled 500 laps to complete. On the final restart with seven laps left in the race, Richard Childress Racing driver Dale Earnhardt would manage to pull away from the field, completing a dominant performance where Earnhardt led 456 laps of the race. The victory was Earnhardt's 36th career NASCAR Winston Cup Series victory and his second victory of the season. To fill out the top three, Roush Racing driver Mark Martin and Hendrick Motorsports driver Ken Schrader would finish second and third, respectively.

== Background ==
The layout of Dover Downs International Speedway, the venue where the race was held.

Dover Downs International Speedway is an oval race track in Dover, Delaware, United States that has held at least two NASCAR races since it opened in 1969. In addition to NASCAR, the track also hosted USAC and the NTT IndyCar Series. The track features one layout, a 1-mile (1.6 km) concrete oval, with 24° banking in the turns and 9° banking on the straights. The speedway is owned and operated by Dover Motorsports.

The track, nicknamed "The Monster Mile", was built in 1969 by Melvin Joseph of Melvin L. Joseph Construction Company, Inc., with an asphalt surface, but was replaced with concrete in 1995. Six years later in 2001, the track's capacity moved to 135,000 seats, making the track have the largest capacity of sports venue in the mid-Atlantic. In 2002, the name changed to Dover International Speedway from Dover Downs International Speedway after Dover Downs Gaming and Entertainment split, making Dover Motorsports. From 2007 to 2009, the speedway worked on an improvement project called "The Monster Makeover", which expanded facilities at the track and beautified the track. After the 2014 season, the track's capacity was reduced to 95,500 seats.

=== Entry list ===
- (R) denotes rookie driver.

#	Driver	Team	Make	Sponsor
2	Ernie Irvan	U.S. Racing	Pontiac	Kroger
3	Dale Earnhardt	Richard Childress Racing	Chevrolet	GM Goodwrench Service Plus
4	Rick Wilson	Morgan–McClure Motorsports	Oldsmobile	Kodak
5	Geoff Bodine	Hendrick Motorsports	Chevrolet	Levi Garrett
6	Mark Martin	Roush Racing	Ford	Stroh's Light
7	Alan Kulwicki	AK Racing	Ford	Zerex
8	Bobby Hillin Jr.	Stavola Brothers Racing	Buick	Miller High Life
9	Bill Elliott	Melling Racing	Ford	Coors Light
10	Derrike Cope	Whitcomb Racing	Pontiac	Purolator Filters
11	Terry Labonte	Junior Johnson & Associates	Ford	Budweiser
15	Brett Bodine	Bud Moore Engineering	Ford	Motorcraft
16	Larry Pearson (R)	Pearson Racing	Buick	Chattanooga Chew
17	Darrell Waltrip	Hendrick Motorsports	Chevrolet	Tide
21	Neil Bonnett	Wood Brothers Racing	Ford	Citgo
23	Eddie Bierschwale	B&B Racing	Oldsmobile	B&B Racing
25	Ken Schrader	Hendrick Motorsports	Chevrolet	Folgers
26	Ricky Rudd	King Racing	Buick	Quaker State
27	Rusty Wallace	Blue Max Racing	Pontiac	Kodiak
28	Davey Allison	Robert Yates Racing	Ford	Texaco, Havoline
29	Dale Jarrett	Cale Yarborough Motorsports	Pontiac	Hardee's
30	Michael Waltrip	Bahari Racing	Pontiac	Country Time
33	Harry Gant	Jackson Bros. Motorsports	Oldsmobile	Skoal Bandit
43	Richard Petty	Petty Enterprises	Pontiac	STP
49	Bill Flowers	Hylton Motorsports	Buick	Hylton Motorsports
52	Jimmy Means	Jimmy Means Racing	Pontiac	Alka-Seltzer
55	Phil Parsons	Jackson Bros. Motorsports	Oldsmobile	Skoal, Crown Central Petroleum
57	Hut Stricklin (R)	Osterlund Racing	Pontiac	Heinz
71	Dave Marcis	Marcis Auto Racing	Chevrolet	Lifebuoy
75	Morgan Shepherd	RahMoc Enterprises	Pontiac	Valvoline
80	Jimmy Horton	S&H Racing	Pontiac	S&H Racing
83	Lake Speed	Speed Racing	Oldsmobile	Bull's-Eye Barbecue Sauce
84	Dick Trickle (R)	Stavola Brothers Racing	Buick	Miller High Life
88	Jimmy Spencer (R)	Baker–Schiff Racing	Pontiac	Crisco
94	Sterling Marlin	Hagan Racing	Oldsmobile	Sunoco
99	Norm Benning	O'Neil Racing	Chevrolet	O'Neil Racing

== Qualifying ==
Qualifying was split into two rounds. The first round was held on Friday, June 2, at 3:00 PM EST. Each driver would have one lap to set a time. During the first round, the top 20 drivers in the round would be guaranteed a starting spot in the race. If a driver was not able to guarantee a spot in the first round, they had the option to scrub their time from the first round and try and run a faster lap time in a second round qualifying run, held on Saturday, June 3, at 11:30 AM EST. As with the first round, each driver would have one lap to set a time. For this specific race, positions 21-40 would be decided on time, and depending on who needed it, a select amount of positions were given to cars who had not otherwise qualified but were high enough in owner's points; up to two provisionals were given.

Mark Martin, driving for Roush Racing, would win the pole, setting a time of 24.933 and an average speed of 144.387 miles per hour (232.368 km/h) in the first round.

No drivers would fail to qualify.

=== Full qualifying results ===
Pos.	#	Driver	Team	Make	Time	Speed
1	6	Mark Martin	Roush Racing	Ford	24.933	144.387
2	3	Dale Earnhardt	Richard Childress Racing	Chevrolet	25.011	143.937
3	27	Rusty Wallace	Blue Max Racing	Pontiac	25.059	143.661
4	75	Morgan Shepherd	RahMoc Enterprises	Pontiac	25.072	143.586
5	25	Ken Schrader	Hendrick Motorsports	Chevrolet	25.074	143.575
6	4	Rick Wilson	Morgan–McClure Motorsports	Oldsmobile	25.081	143.535
7	26	Ricky Rudd	King Racing	Buick	25.095	143.455
8	9	Bill Elliott	Melling Racing	Ford	25.120	143.312
9	15	Brett Bodine	Bud Moore Engineering	Ford	25.135	143.227
10	5	Geoff Bodine	Hendrick Motorsports	Chevrolet	25.163	143.067
11	16	Larry Pearson (R)	Pearson Racing	Buick	25.200	142.857
12	17	Darrell Waltrip	Hendrick Motorsports	Chevrolet	25.253	142.557
13	33	Harry Gant	Jackson Bros. Motorsports	Oldsmobile	25.299	142.298
14	29	Dale Jarrett	Cale Yarborough Motorsports	Pontiac	25.305	142.264
15	11	Terry Labonte	Junior Johnson & Associates	Ford	25.335	142.096
16	30	Michael Waltrip	Bahari Racing	Pontiac	25.337	142.085
17	7	Alan Kulwicki	AK Racing	Ford	25.344	142.045
18	84	Dick Trickle (R)	Stavola Brothers Racing	Buick	25.357	141.973
19	83	Lake Speed	Speed Racing	Oldsmobile	25.389	141.794
20	88	Jimmy Spencer (R)	Baker–Schiff Racing	Pontiac	25.467	141.359
Failed to lock in Round 1
21	21	Neil Bonnett	Wood Brothers Racing	Ford	25.137	143.215
22	28	Davey Allison	Robert Yates Racing	Ford	25.146	143.164
23	2	Ernie Irvan	U.S. Racing	Pontiac	25.218	142.755
24	94	Sterling Marlin	Hagan Racing	Oldsmobile	25.398	141.743
25	55	Phil Parsons	Jackson Bros. Motorsports	Oldsmobile	25.490	141.232
26	8	Bobby Hillin Jr.	Stavola Brothers Racing	Buick	25.543	140.939
27	23	Eddie Bierschwale	B&B Racing	Oldsmobile	25.556	140.867
28	10	Derrike Cope	Whitcomb Racing	Pontiac	25.573	140.773
29	80	Jimmy Horton	S&H Racing	Pontiac	25.637	140.422
30	43	Richard Petty	Petty Enterprises	Pontiac	25.644	140.384
31	57	Hut Stricklin (R)	Osterlund Racing	Pontiac	25.703	140.061
32	71	Dave Marcis	Marcis Auto Racing	Chevrolet	25.787	139.605
33	52	Jimmy Means	Jimmy Means Racing	Pontiac	26.166	137.583
34	49	Bill Flowers	Hylton Motorsports	Buick	27.384	131.464
35	99	Norm Benning	O'Neil Racing	Chevrolet	-	-
Official first round qualifying results
Official starting lineup

== Race results ==
Fin	St	#	Driver	Team	Make	Laps	Led	Status	Pts	Winnings
1	2	3	Dale Earnhardt	Richard Childress Racing	Chevrolet	500	456	running	185	$59,350
2	1	6	Mark Martin	Roush Racing	Ford	500	2	running	175	$38,950
3	5	25	Ken Schrader	Hendrick Motorsports	Chevrolet	500	22	running	170	$36,525
4	15	11	Terry Labonte	Junior Johnson & Associates	Ford	500	6	running	165	$18,425
5	3	27	Rusty Wallace	Blue Max Racing	Pontiac	500	9	running	160	$20,975
6	7	26	Ricky Rudd	King Racing	Buick	500	0	running	150	$11,675
7	21	21	Neil Bonnett	Wood Brothers Racing	Ford	499	3	running	151	$10,925
8	8	9	Bill Elliott	Melling Racing	Ford	499	0	running	142	$16,625
9	12	17	Darrell Waltrip	Hendrick Motorsports	Chevrolet	498	0	running	138	$13,675
10	25	55	Phil Parsons	Jackson Bros. Motorsports	Oldsmobile	497	0	running	134	$11,275
11	14	29	Dale Jarrett	Cale Yarborough Motorsports	Pontiac	494	0	running	130	$8,025
12	31	57	Hut Stricklin (R)	Osterlund Racing	Pontiac	493	0	running	127	$6,732
13	26	8	Bobby Hillin Jr.	Stavola Brothers Racing	Buick	493	0	running	124	$7,400
14	6	4	Rick Wilson	Morgan–McClure Motorsports	Oldsmobile	492	0	running	121	$6,825
15	9	15	Brett Bodine	Bud Moore Engineering	Ford	492	0	running	118	$7,175
16	32	71	Dave Marcis	Marcis Auto Racing	Chevrolet	491	0	running	115	$6,100
17	23	2	Ernie Irvan	U.S. Racing	Pontiac	491	0	running	112	$3,850
18	19	83	Lake Speed	Speed Racing	Oldsmobile	490	0	running	109	$5,700
19	11	16	Larry Pearson (R)	Pearson Racing	Buick	490	0	running	106	$3,850
20	30	43	Richard Petty	Petty Enterprises	Pontiac	489	0	running	103	$4,375
21	18	84	Dick Trickle (R)	Stavola Brothers Racing	Buick	487	0	running	100	$6,050
22	16	30	Michael Waltrip	Bahari Racing	Pontiac	483	0	accident	97	$5,200
23	13	33	Harry Gant	Jackson Bros. Motorsports	Oldsmobile	482	2	running	99	$9,450
24	33	52	Jimmy Means	Jimmy Means Racing	Pontiac	477	0	running	91	$2,400
25	17	7	Alan Kulwicki	AK Racing	Ford	444	0	running	88	$5,150
26	24	94	Sterling Marlin	Hagan Racing	Oldsmobile	434	0	running	85	$4,950
27	27	23	Eddie Bierschwale	B&B Racing	Oldsmobile	355	0	running	82	$2,875
28	28	10	Derrike Cope	Whitcomb Racing	Pontiac	304	0	engine	79	$2,200
29	10	5	Geoff Bodine	Hendrick Motorsports	Chevrolet	294	0	piston	76	$9,150
30	35	99	Norm Benning	O'Neil Racing	Chevrolet	226	0	steering	73	$2,150
31	29	80	Jimmy Horton	S&H Racing	Pontiac	211	0	engine	70	$2,050
32	22	28	Davey Allison	Robert Yates Racing	Ford	171	0	engine	67	$10,400
33	4	75	Morgan Shepherd	RahMoc Enterprises	Pontiac	140	0	accident	64	$9,950
34	20	88	Jimmy Spencer (R)	Baker–Schiff Racing	Pontiac	75	0	engine	0	$4,500
35	34	49	Bill Flowers	Hylton Motorsports	Buick	2	0	engine	58	$1,800
Official race results

== Standings after the race ==
Drivers' Championship standings

	Pos	Driver	Points
	1	Darrell Waltrip	1,617
1	2	Dale Earnhardt	1,615 (-2)
3	3	Mark Martin	1,543 (-74)
2	4	Geoff Bodine	1,534 (–83)
2	5	Rusty Wallace	1,473 (–144)
2	6	Alan Kulwicki	1,463 (–154)
2	7	Sterling Marlin	1,459 (–158)
1	8	Ken Schrader	1,408 (–209)
1	9	Davey Allison	1,358 (–259)
	10	Bill Elliott	1,353 (–264)
Official driver's standings

- Note: Only the first 10 positions are included for the driver standings.

Previous race: 1989 Coca-Cola 600	NASCAR Winston Cup Series; 1989 season	Next race: 1989 Banquet Frozen Foods 300
