= Conrac =

American electronics manufacturer

Conrac Corporation
- Formerly: Conrac, Inc.; Giannini Controls Corporation (1961–1967
- Type: Public
- Industry: Electronics
- Founded: October 1939; 86 years ago in Newark, New Jersey
- Founders: Leon W. Conrow; George L. Carrington; Harry M. Bessey
- Defunct: May 1987; 39 years ago
- Fate: Acquired by Mark IV Industries
- Headquarters: Duarte, California (1961–1987),
- Number of employees: Over 400 (1983)
- Website: conrac.com (archived)

Conrac Corporation was an American electronics manufacturer independently active from 1939 to 1987. Founded in Newark, New Jersey, as Conrac, Inc., by Leon W. Conrow, George L. Carrington, and Harry M. Bessey, it was founded as a manufacturer of people counters for the movie theater industry. In the late 1940s, Conrac pivoted to manufacturing broadcast reference monitors for television studios, becoming a major innovator in the field, releasing the first commercially available color reference monitor in 1953. In 1961, Conrac was acquired by Giannini Controls Corporation, a diversified aerospace and industrial control company based in Duarte, California; in 1967, Giannini renamed itself to Conrac Corporation. In 1987, Conrac was acquired by Mark IV Industries of New York for $150 million.

== History ==
Conrac, Inc., was founded in Newark, New Jersey, and incorporated in Delaware, in late October 1939, by Leon Whitney Conrow, George L. Carrington, and Harry M. Bessey. Both Conrow and Carrington had co-founded the Altec Services Company, which was formed as a spin-off of the Electrical Research Products, Inc. (ERPI), division of Western Electric, their former employer. Altec later merged with the Lansing Manufacturing Company of Los Angeles to become Altec Lansing, a prominent loudspeaker manufacturer which as of 2026 is still in business; Conrow remained the chairman of Altec Lansing until his death in 1943. Conrac was founded to market an early electrical people counter for the movie theater industry. Called the Conrac Attendance Register, it used a series of light beams and photoelectric sensors to count patrons entering a movie theater's door into an internal register. It was designed in such a way that it would not count patrons leaving the same door.

During the 1940s, Conrac functioned as an electronics manufacturer and distributor serving the Northeastern United States. Conrow died of a heart attack at age 46 at his home in Fair Haven, New Jersey, in December 1943. E. Z. Walters, another Altec associate, was named president of Conrac in the wake of Conrow's death. Conrac's upper management kept close ties with Altec Lansing, with Carrington serving as president and Bessey serving as vice president of Altec Lansing while running Conrac on the side (Carrington died in 1959, age 57). In 1949, with the widespread rise of television following World War II, Conrac pivoted to manufacturing television sets. In May 1949, Conrac acquired Peyton Video, a manufacturer of consumer television sets based in Glendale, California, serving the West Coast of the United States. Under the brand name Fleetwood, Conrac began manufacturing consumer sets from Peyton's facilities in Greater Los Angeles.

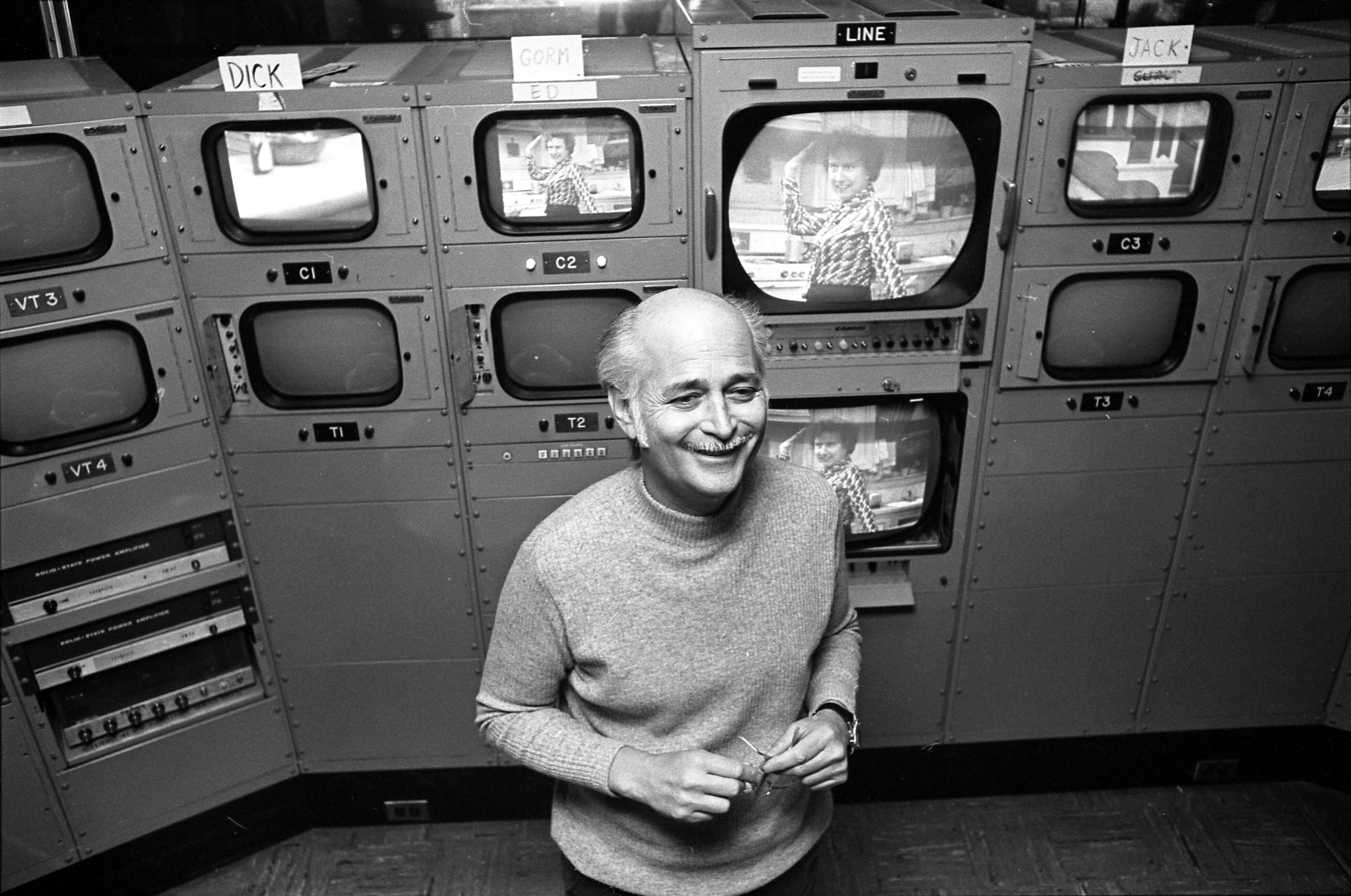
Norman Lear, pictured in 1975, standing before a bank of Conrac reference monitors during the production of an episode of All in the Family

In June 1950, William J. Moreland succeeded Walters as president of Conrac. Under Moreland's tenure, Conrac began shifting its focus from consumer sets to broadcast reference monitors, as used in television stations and production studios. Its first reference monitor, the black-and-white CA-16, was used widely by CBS. In 1953, Conrac developed the first commercially available color reference monitor. Conrac rapidly became the market leader for reference monitors in the television and video production industries, its commercial success continuing well into the 1980s.

In 1961, Conrac was acquired by Giannini Controls Corporation, a diversified aerospace and industrial control company based in Duarte, California. Giannini subsequently renamed itself to Conrac Corporation in 1967. Donald H. Putnam, previously of Giannini, was named chairman and president of Conrac, serving in this capacity until 1984. Moreland was demoted to manager of Giannini's Conrac Division, which was in charge of the company's reference monitor production, until 1968, when he became VP and manager of Conrac's Communications Group. He retired in 1974 and died in 1986.

Between 1968 and 1969, Conrac worked closely with the RCA Corporation to define a set of controlled phosphors for use in color reference monitors. This standard was codified by the Society of Motion Picture and Television Engineers as SMPTE C, with the C standing for Conrac. The parameters of SMPTE C were largely based on Conrac's existing color reference monitors, widely used in the television industry at the time, making SMPTE C more of a de facto standard based on Conrac's equipment than a de jure standard like NTSC. According to Society for Information Display's Raymond M. Soneira, "it was the Conrac color gamut rather than the NTSC gamut that was the real color-television standard gamut". SMPTE C closely resembles the modern ITU-R Recommendation 709 standard for HDTV image encoding, which is only 13 percent larger in gamut, and served as the direct foundation for the Rec. 601 standard for digital television.

By the mid-1970s, Conrac had entered the computer industry, initially producing monitors as part of turnkey systems for investment bankers such as Morgan Guaranty Trust. By the early 1980s, Conrac was a major player in high-specification computer monitors, serving CAD/CAM, military, aerospace, and medical imaging. Its later computer monitors were compatible with the IBM Personal Computer and its derivatives and the Macintosh II. Notable users of Conrac's computer monitors included NASA, who used them aboard the Space Shuttle, as well as NASA's Jet Propulsion Laboratory, who used Conrac's monitors to view pictures from Jupiter and Saturn taken during the Voyager program. Conrac's competitors in the computer industry at the time included Barco, Intergraph, Hitachi, and Mitsubishi Electric.

In around the early 1980s, Conrac expanded to telephony products, establishing the Alston Division from their Duarte headquarters to market digital private branch exchange equipment to enterprises. In 1983, Conrac acquired Code-A-Phone, a telephony manufacturer based in Oregon, and began reselling their namesake answering machine.

In May 1987, Conrac was acquired by Mark IV Industries of New York for $150 million.
