= Mann+Hummel =

German manufacturing company

MANN+HUMMEL
- Company type: GmbH
- Industry: Automotive
- Founded: 1941; 85 years ago
- Founders: Adolf Mann; Erich Hummel
- Headquarters: Ludwigsburg, Germany
- Key people: Kurk Wilks (CEO); Emese Weissenbacher (CFO)
- Number of employees: 21,149
- Subsidiaries: Purolator Filters
- Website: www.mann-hummel.com/en.html

MANN+HUMMEL Gruppe is a family-owned manufacturer of liquid and air filter systems, intake systems and cabin air filters headquartered in Ludwigsburg, Baden-Württemberg, Germany.

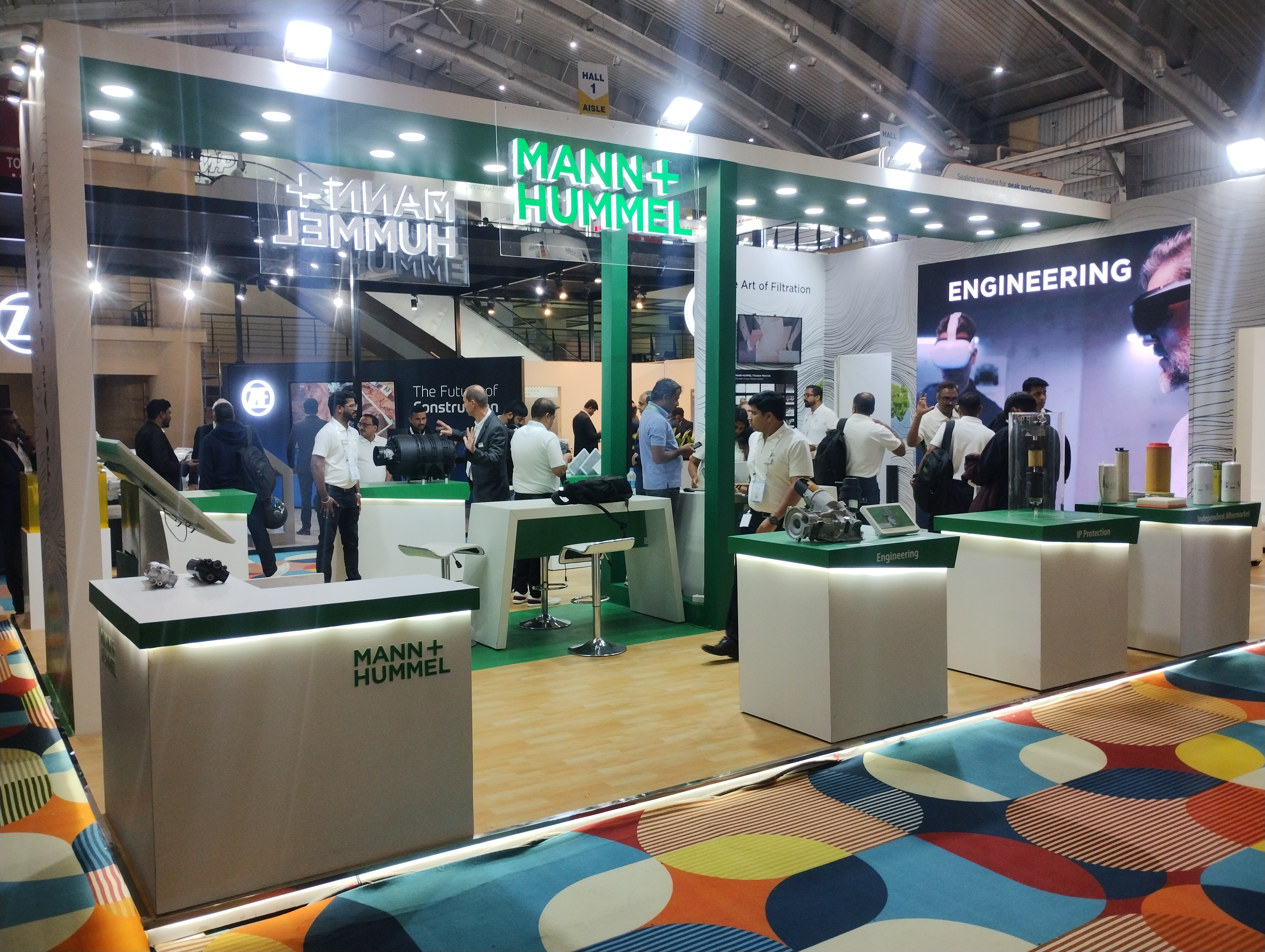
Mann+Hummel at EXCON 2025, BIEC

== History ==
Adolf Mann and Erich Hummel were the heads of the Stuttgart clothing company Bleyle, which during the Second World War became a supplier to the fellow-citizen company Mahle. They thus founded Filterwerk MANN+HUMMEL GmbH in 1941 and employees produced fabric filters for the automotive industry. Customers include Maybach-Motorenbau with the HL230 engine, used on Panzer tanks such as Panther and Tiger. After the end of the war, in 1945, a branch was opened in Ludwigsburg, followed by Bösperde (1946) and Marklkofen (1962).

From the late 1940s onwards, MANN+HUMMEL was also active in the textile industry under the name Mann Pamina Moden, before this line of business was sold to Schiesser in 1974. Since 1948, there is further diversification beyond filter production through the equipment manufacturing division, particularly for the plastics industry. Mann died in 1971 followed by Hummel in 1984.

In 2016, MANN+HUMMEL acquired the filter business of the American auto parts company Affinia Group, and with it almost all of the company. Kurk Wilks has been MANN+HUMMEL's CEO since January 2020.

== Brands ==
- Purolator Filters
- MANN-FILTER
- WIX
- Senzit
- Microdyn-Nadir
- Pamlico Air
- Tridim Hardy
- Qlair
- Seccua
- i2m
- Tridim Filter Corporation
- Helsatech Molecular Filtration
- FILTRON
- Purar
