= Purolator Inc. =

Canadian courier company

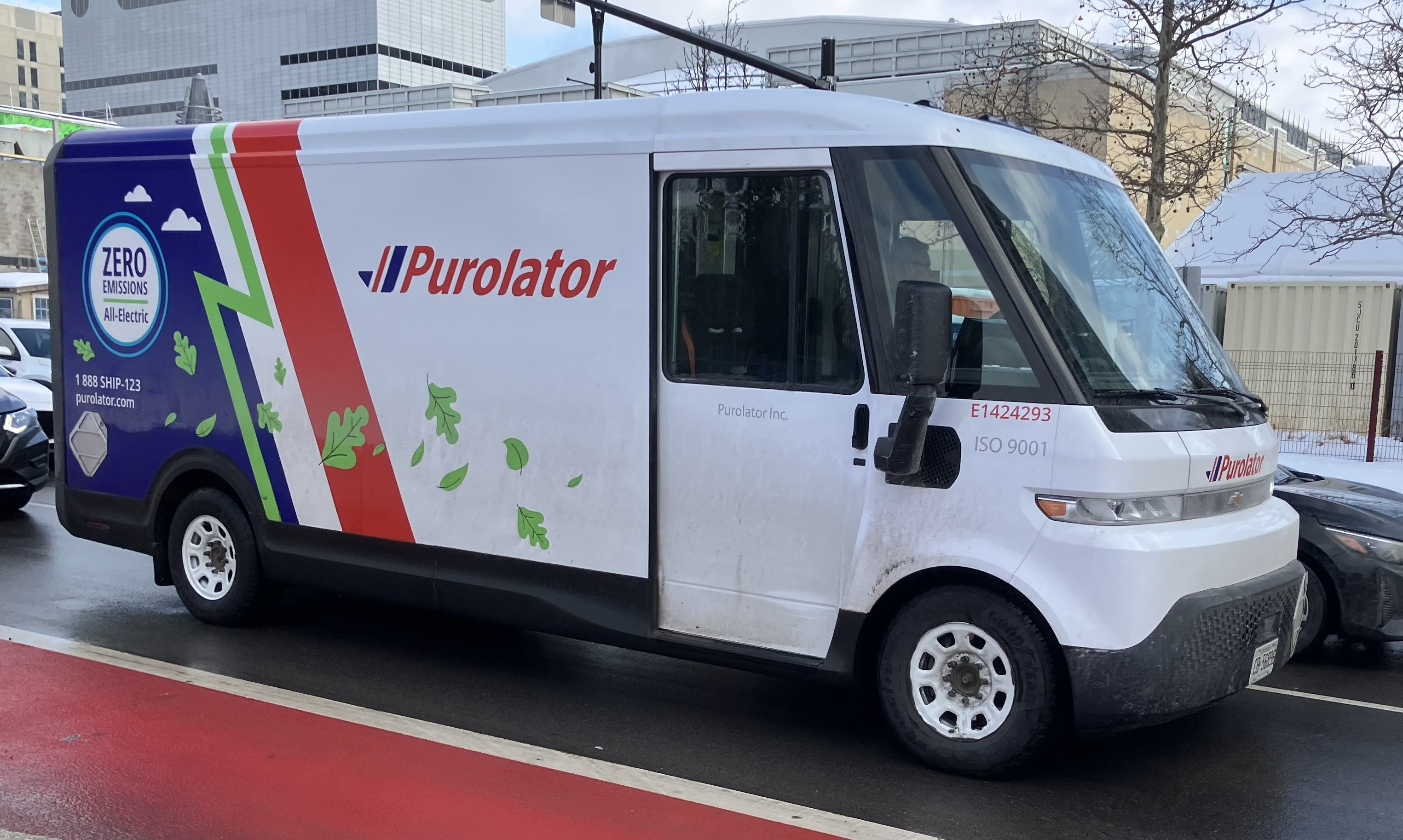
- An all-electric Chevrolet BrightDrop operated by Purolator
- Formerly: Trans Canada Couriers, Ltd.
- Company type: Joint Venture
- Industry: Courier, logistics, supply chain, transportation, trucking
- Founded: 5 December 1960; 65 years ago in Eastern Canada
- Headquarters: Mississauga, Ontario, Canada
- Number of locations: 176 operations facilities; 104 Shipping Centres; (2021)
- Key people: John Ferguson (President and CEO)
- Products: Parcel delivery; Logistics; Courier services; Freight services; Supply chain
- Revenue: CA$2.2 billion (2020)
- Owner: Canada Post (91%); Rainmaker Investments Inc. (7%); Others (2%)
- Number of employees: 14,000+ (2020)
- Subsidiaries: Purolator International
- Website: purolator.com

Purolator Inc. is a Canadian integrated freight, parcel and logistics company majority owned by Canada Post. It is headquartered in Mississauga, Ontario, and operates one of the largest courier and ground delivery networks in Canada.

== History ==
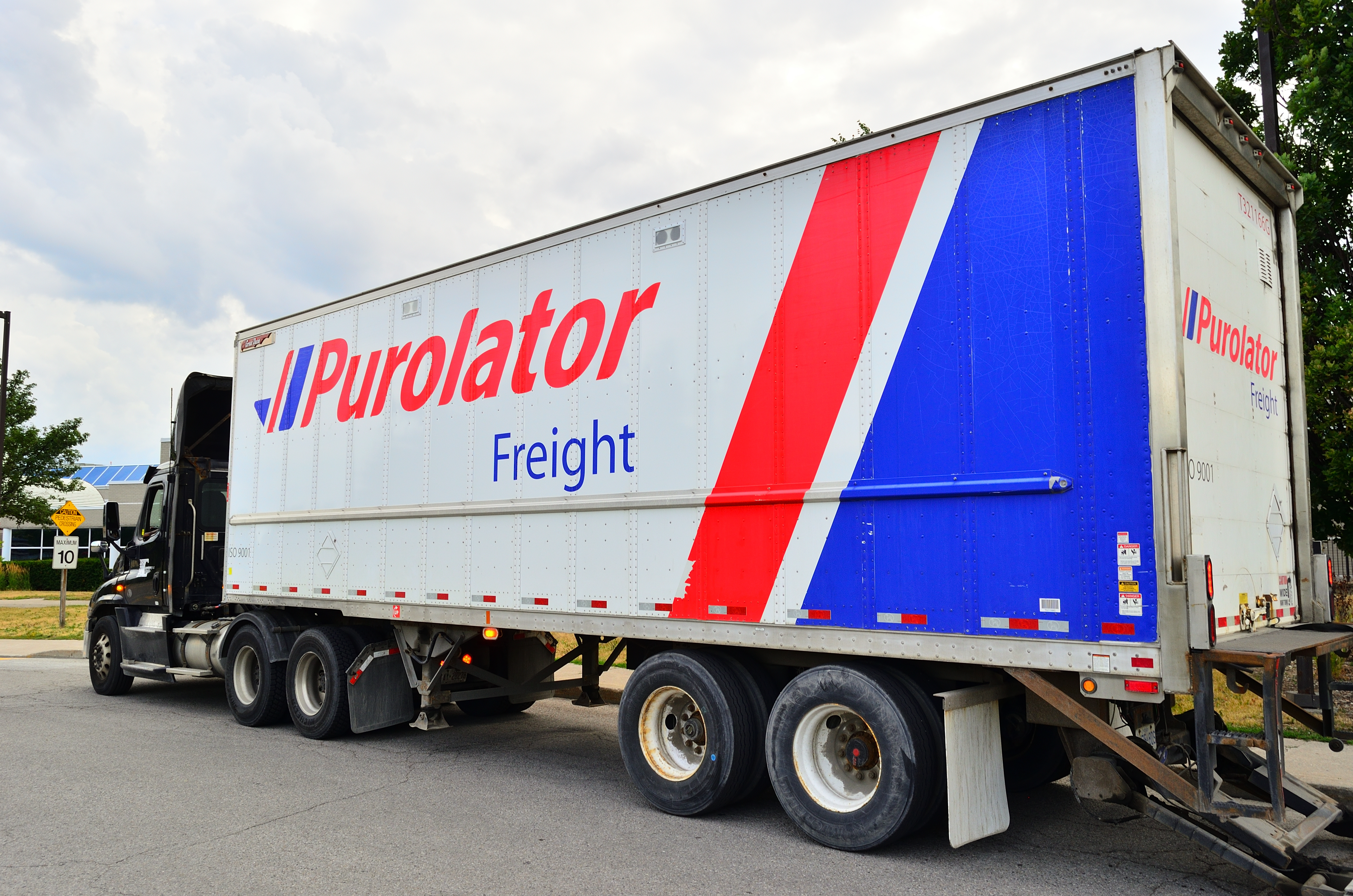
Purolator Freight truck

Purolator began operations on December 5, 1960, as Trans Canadian Couriers Ltd., with two employees and restricted operating licenses for the provinces of Ontario and Quebec. It was established as a Canadian subsidiary of the New York City-based American Courier Corporation.

In 1967, American Courier Corporation was acquired by Purolator, a U.S. manufacturer of oil filters and air filters, for over US$5 million. By 1970, it operated 84 vehicles. The courier subsidiary was subsequently renamed Purolator Courier Ltd. – with the name "Purolator" being a contraction of "Pure Oil Later", a reference to its filtration products parent. In 1987, following the breakup of the Purolator parent group, Purolator Courier Ltd. was sold to Onex Capital Corp. for approximately US$170 million, returning the courier business to Canadian ownership while retaining the Purolator name.

In 1987, Purolator partnered with DHL's predecessor (Airborne Express) to better serve the American market which continued until 2008. In 1993, Canada Post became the majority shareholder and now owns 91% of the business with 7% owned by Rainmaker Investments Ltd. and 2% by others. Purolator opened its first fully automated sortation hub in Ontario in 2022.

During the COVID-19 pandemic, Purolator delivered a record 46 million packages during the 2020 peak season as e-commerce volumes surged.

In March 2023, Purolator announced a roughly $1 billion investment over seven years to electrify 60 per cent of its last-mile delivery fleet, including the purchase of more than 3,500 fully electric vehicles and the electrification of more than 60 terminals across Canada. In December 2023, Purolator acquired Williams PharmaLogistics, a company focused on healthcare, pharmaceutical, and temperature- controlled logistics services.

By 2025, Purolator's fleet of Motiv Power Systems electric trucks had surpassed one million kilometres in real-world use, and the company reported that more than four million packages had been delivered using electric vehicles.

In February 2025, Purolator acquired Livingston International, a Toronto-based customs brokerage and global freight forwarding firm, from Platinum Equity for an undisclosed amount.

== Operations ==
Purolator operates an integrated network providing courier, parcel, freight, and logistics services to, from, and within Canada, with cross-border capabilities through Purolator International in the United States. The company operates more than 175 operations facilities and over 100 shipping centres in Canada, and covers all Canadian postal codes. It delivered over 25 million packages in 2018 and in 2019 operated 170 terminals in Canada and an additional 30 in the US.

It provides express shipping, ground delivery, truckload (TL) and less-than-truckload (LTL) freight, freight forwarding, healthcare and specialized shipping, and e-commerce returns management. Air freight services rely on partnerships with carriers such as Cargojet, which has held a master services agreement with Purolator and Canada Post since 2014; John C. Munro Hamilton International Airport serves as the principal air cargo hub for the company.

Since 2003, Purolator has run the Purolator Tackle Hunger program in partnership with Food Banks Canada and the Canadian Football League. The program delivers food to food banks throughout Canada.

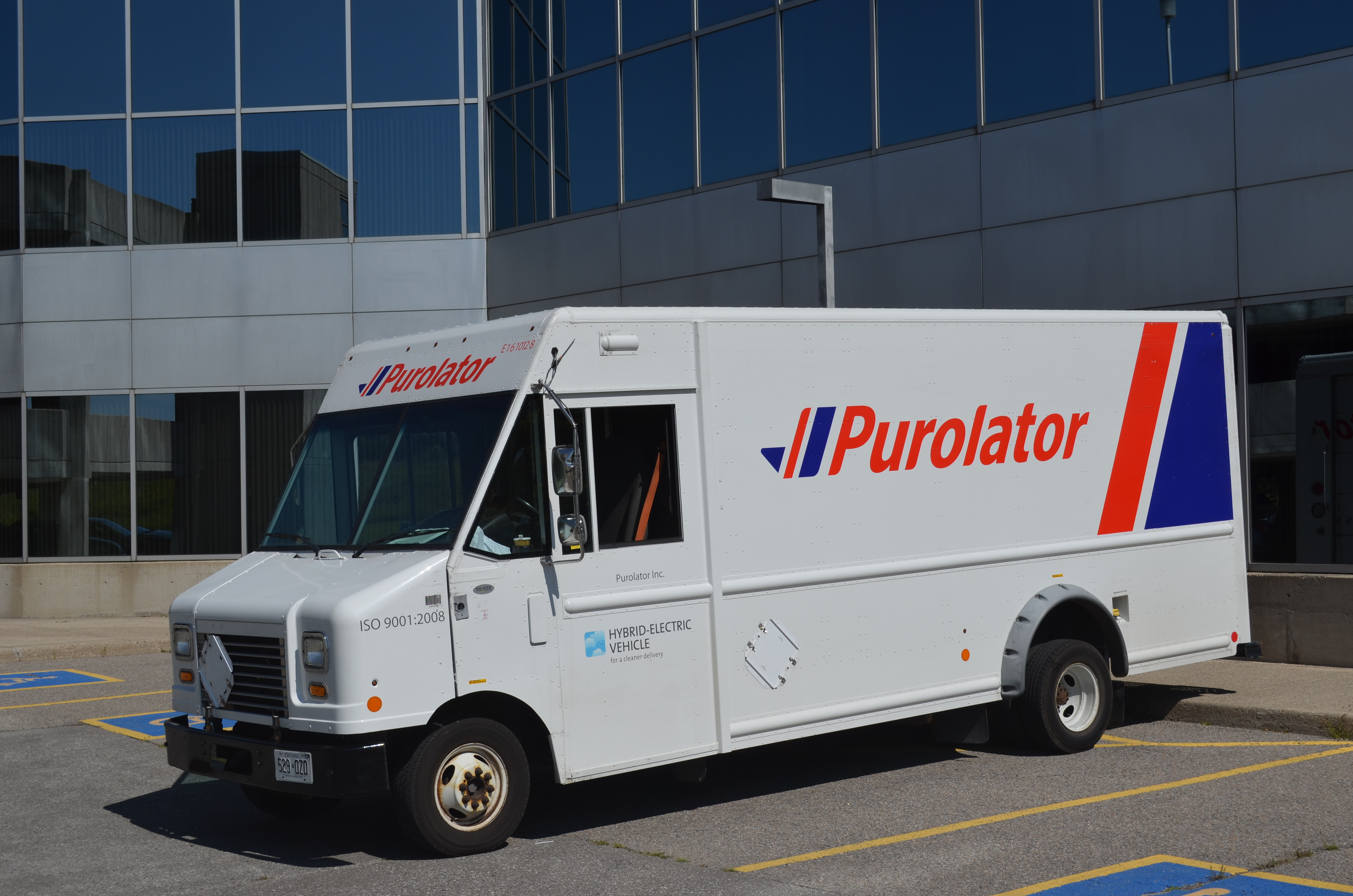
A Purolator hybrid electric vehicle

On September 24, 2007, Purolator Inc. introduced the Unicell Quicksider, a prototype full-electric, lightweight urban delivery vehicle, developed by a consortium led by Toronto-based Unicell Limited with ArvinMeritor, Electrovaya, the Transportation Development Centre of Transport Canada, and others.
