= Dayco =

American parts supplier

Dayco Incorporated

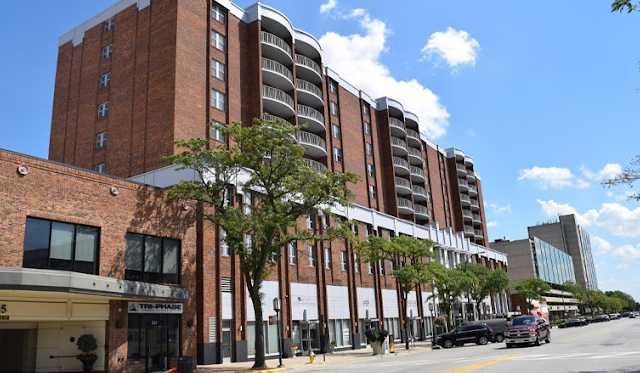
- Dayco World Headquarters
- Industry: Manufacturing
- Founded: 1905 Dayton, Ohio, United States
- Headquarters: Birmingham, Michigan, United States
- Number of locations: 40
- Area served: Worldwide
- Key people: Craig Frohock
- Owner: Hidden Harbor Capital Partners
- Number of employees: 1,900 (2024)
- Website: www.dayco.com

Dayco Incorporated, formerly known as Dayco Products and Mark IV Industries, is an American parts supplier for construction, automotive, and industrial companies. The companies annual earnings are approximately US$150 million. Its main customers include Caterpillar and General Motors.

== History ==
Dayco was founded in 1905 as Dayton Rubber Manufacturing Co. by Col. J. C. Hooven in Ohio. The company initially made products such as garden hoses out of natural rubber. In 1908, the company hired John A. MacMillan, and began creating his product, the airless tire. The company also produced the first whitewall tires in 1913. Beginning in the early 1920s, the company entered a diversification period when it radically increased the variety of its products. Dayco would eventually make many different rubber parts, as well as some textiles. It also pioneered some synthetic rubber products, including developing the first synthetic rubber tire. The company would be a valuable supplier of military products during World War II. The company officially changed its name to the DAYCO Corporation in 1960.

== Controversies ==
Dayco filed for bankruptcy protection in April 2009, and emerged from bankruptcy approximately 6 months later. It eliminated about $750 million in debt during the bankruptcy. In 2015, Dayco attracted controversy when it announced it would be closing its two Distribution Centers in North Carolina and one in Nevada. Dayco was consolidating into its Memphis, Tennessee Distribution Facility. The move attracted media attention and resulted in several hundred jobs being lost.
