= Bill Flowers (racing driver) =

American racing driver

- Born: March 3, 1959 (age 67); Powder Springs, Georgia, U.S.

NASCAR Cup Series career
- 1 race run over 1 year
- Best finish: 98th (1989)
- First race: 1989 Budweiser 500 (Dover)
Wins	Top tens	Poles
0	0	0

ARCA Menards Series career
- 29 races run over 12 years
- Best finish: 22nd (1999)
- First race: 1986 Talladega ARCA 500k (Talladega)
- Last race: 2000 Georgia Boot 400 (Atlanta)
Wins	Top tens	Poles
0	0	0
- Statistics up to date as of December 14, 2024.

Bill Flowers (born March 3, 1959) is an American former professional stock car racing driver who has previously competed in the NASCAR Winston Cup Series and the ARCA Re/Max Series.

Flowers also competed in the NASCAR Goody's Dash Series and the Crate Racin' USA Dirt Late Model Series.

== Motorsports career results ==
=== NASCAR ===
(key) (Bold - Pole position awarded by qualifying time. Italics - Pole position earned by points standings or practice time. * – Most laps led.)

==== Winston Cup Series ====
NASCAR Winston Cup Series results
Year	Team	No.	Make	1	2	3	4	5	6	7	8	9	10	11	12	13	14	15	16	17	18	19	20	21	22	23	24	25	26	27	28	29	NWCC	Pts	Ref
1989	Hylton Motorsports	49	Buick	DAY	CAR	ATL	RCH	DAR	BRI	NWS	MAR	TAL	CLT	DOV; 35	SON	POC	MCH	DAY	POC	TAL	GLN	MCH	BRI	DAR	RCH	DOV	MAR	CLT	NWS	CAR	PHO	ATL	98th	58	

==== Charlotte/Daytona Dash Series ====
Charlotte/Daytona Dash Series results
Year	Team	No.	Make	1	2	3	4	5	6	7	8	9	10	11	12	13	14	15	16	17	NCDDS	Pts	Ref
1984	N/A	43	Chevy	DAY	NWS	MIL	GRE	NSV; 13	LAN; 11	GRE; 7	BIR	ROU; 10	HCY; 10	DAR; 12	ODS; 7	MAR; 26	NWS; 10				14th	1411	
1985	N/A	43	Chevy	DAY; 11	LAN; 13	GRE; 12	CLT; 25	ODS	LAN	BIR; 15		ROU; 16	SBO	STH; 11	ODS; 14	HCY	CLT; 16				16th	1183	
1985	N/A	43	Pontiac								MMS; 16										16th	1183	
1986	N/A	43	Chevy	DAY; 16	HCY	LAN	ASH	FCS	ROU	CLT	POC	STH	LAN	SBO	BRI	HCY	SBO	HCY	CLT	NWS	N/A	0	

=== ARCA Re/Max Series ===
(key) (Bold – Pole position awarded by qualifying time. Italics – Pole position earned by points standings or practice time. * – Most laps led. ** – All laps led.)

ARCA Re/Max Series results
Year	Team	No.	Make	1	2	3	4	5	6	7	8	9	10	11	12	13	14	15	16	17	18	19	20	21	22	ARMSC	Pts	Ref
1986	Wayne Peterson Racing	06	Buick	ATL	DAY	ATL	TAL; 14	SIR	SSP	FRS	KIL	CSP														N/A	0	
1986	Wayne Peterson Racing	06	Chevy										TAL; 30	BLN	ISF	DSF	TOL	MCS	ATL							N/A	0	
1987	N/A	35	Chevy	DAY; 24	ATL; DNQ	TAL; 15	DEL	ACS	TOL	ROC	POC	FRS	KIL	TAL; 13	FRS	ISF	INF	DSF	SLM	ATL						N/A	0	
1988	Norm Frame Racing	35	Buick	DAY	ATL; 25	TAL	FRS	PCS	ROC	POC	WIN	KIL	ACS	SLM	POC	TAL; DNQ	DEL	FRS	ISF	DSF	SLM	ATL				N/A	0	
1989	Bill Flowers	35	Pontiac	DAY; 38	ATL	KIL	TAL; 16	FRS	POC	KIL	HAG	POC	TAL; 24	DEL	FRS	ISF	TOL	DSF	SLM	ATL						N/A	0	
1990	Bill Flowers	35	Pontiac	DAY; DNQ	ATL	KIL	TAL	FRS	POC	KIL	TOL	HAG	POC	TAL	MCH	ISF	TOL	DSF	WIN	DEL	ATL					N/A	0	
1991	Wayne Peterson Racing	43	Pontiac	DAY	ATL; 16	KIL	TAL; 23	TOL	FRS	POC	MCH	KIL	FRS	DEL	POC	TAL; DNQ	HPT	MCH	ISF	TOL	DSF	TWS	ATL			N/A	0	
1993	McNeese Racing	78	Chevy	DAY	FIF	TWS	TAL; 24	KIL	CMS	FRS	TOL	POC	MCH	FRS	POC	KIL	ISF	DSF	TOL	SLM	WIN	ATL				N/A	0	
1997	Cole Young Racing	44	Chevy	DAY; 19	ATL; 19	SLM	CLT	CLT	POC; 13	MCH; 28	SBS	TOL	KIL	FRS	MIN	POC; 23	MCH; 28	DSF	GTW	SLM	WIN					N/A	0	
1997	Cole Young Racing	10	Chevy																			CLT; 17				N/A	0	
1997	Cole Young Racing	26	Chevy																				TAL; DNQ	ISF		N/A	0	
1997	Cole Young Racing	9	Chevy																						ATL; 33	N/A	0	
1998	Wayne Peterson Racing	18	Pontiac	DAY	ATL	SLM	CLT	MEM	MCH	POC	SBS	TOL	PPR	POC	KIL	FRS	ISF	ATL	DSF	SLM	TEX	WIN	CLT; 22			N/A	0	
1998	Wayne Peterson Racing	18	Chevy																					TAL; DNQ	ATL; 39	N/A	0	
1999	Cole Young Racing	44	Chevy	DAY; DNQ	ATL; 16			CLT; 24	MCH	POC; DNQ	TOL	SBS	BLN; DNQ	POC; DNQ								CLT; DNQ	TAL; DNQ	ATL; DNQ		22nd	1450	
1999	Cole Young Racing	44	Pontiac			SLM; DNQ	AND; 29								KIL; DNQ	FRS; DNQ	FLM; 19	ISF; DNQ	WIN; DNQ	DSF; 16	SLM; 22					22nd	1450	
2000	Capital City Motorsports	38	Ford	DAY	SLM	AND	CLT	KIL	FRS	MCH	POC	TOL	KEN	BLN	POC	WIN	ISF	KEN	DSF	SLM	CLT	TAL	ATL; 23			116th	115	
2002	Capital City Motorsports	83	Ford	DAY	ATL	NSH; QL^{†}	SLM	KEN	CLT	KAN	POC	MCH	TOL	SBO	KEN	BLN	POC	NSH	ISF	WIN	DSF	CHI	SLM	TAL	CLT	N/A	0	
^{†} - Qualified but replaced by Dennis English
