= Purolator International =

U.S.-based freight forwarder

- Formerly: Purolator Courier US, Ltd.; Purolator USA, Inc. (until 2011)
- Type: Subsidiary
- Industry: Freight forwarding
- Founded: 1998; 28 years ago
- Headquarters: Jericho, New York, United States
- Number of locations: 33 (32 American, 1 Canadian)
- Key people: Paul Tessy (senior VP)
- Products: Freight forwarding
- Parent: Purolator Inc.
- Website: purolatorinternational.com

Purolator International (formerly Purolator Courier US, Ltd. and then Purolator USA, Inc.) is a US-based freight forwarder that provides cross border logistics services between the United States and Canada. Headquartered in Jericho, New York, the company is a subsidiary of Canada-based Purolator Inc.

Purolator International was previously known as Purolator USA. During 2011, an organizational change merged Purolator USA and Global Supply Chain Services (GSC) into a single business entity. GSC previously operated as a unit of Purolator Inc. Purolator Inc. was formerly known as Purolator Courier Ltd.

The company is non-asset based and partners with a number of providers for deliveries between the US and Canada.

== History ==
Purolator began its US operations in 1947, when Armored Carrier Corp. was incorporated in the state of New York. The company name was changed to American Courier Corp. in 1966. The company was purchased by the Purolator oil filter company in 1967 and was renamed Purolator Courier Corp. in 1973. The name Purolator is short for "Pure Oil Later." In 1984 Purolator sold its subsidiary, Purolator Armored Inc., to Mayne Nickless Ltd. which also owned Loomis Armored Car Service Inc.

In the 1960s, Trans Canadian Couriers was established as a Canadian subsidiary of American Courier Corp. Like its American counterpart, the company was renamed as Purolator Courier Ltd. after being purchased by Purolator Filter. In 1987, Purolator Courier was split up and sold by its parent company. Purolator Courier Ltd. was sold to Onex Corporation and become a stand-alone Canadian entity, while the U.S.-based Purolator Courier Corp. was acquired by Wilton, CT-based Emery Worldwide. In 1989, Emery was acquired by Consolidated Freightways, Inc. which gained US rights to the Purolator name. Purolator Courier Ltd. reclaimed rights to the Purolator name in 1996.

In 1994, a marketing alliance was formed between Purolator Courier Ltd. and Canada Post. That venture was called Canadian Distribution Services (CDS). CDS was later renamed Purolator Courier, US, Ltd. In 1998, Purolator Courier, US was incorporated in the United States. John T. Costanzo was named president of Purolator Courier US, Ltd. in 2001, and in 2004, the company legally changed its name to Purolator USA, Inc.

In 2011, Purolator USA was combined with Global Supply Chain Services (GSC) to form Purolator International. Purolator International remains a wholly owned subsidiary of Ontario-based Purolator Inc.

Purolator International has maintained a headquarters facility in Jericho, NY since 2005. It has offices throughout the United States.

== Business developments ==
Purolator surpassed the $100 million annual sales figure in 2008. In 2009, the company introduced its “Beacon Client Portal,” a web-based shipping, tracking, reporting and billing application. Also in that year, Purolator's Chicago and Farmingdale processing facilities were certified by the Transportation Security Administration (TSA) for participation in the Certified Cargo Screening Program (CCSP).

In 2010, the company launched Purolator Express an overnight and second–day delivery service for shipments to Canada. Currently Purolator Express is only available to businesses located in the New York-metro area.

== Environmental initiatives ==
Purolator International and Purolator Inc. maintain a combined fleet of more than 4,000 owned-or-contracted delivery vehicles throughout the United States and Canada. The combined fleet is the largest dedicated fleet in North America.

In 2000, Purolator Courier Ltd. (now known as Purolator Inc.) announced a “Greening the Fleet” initiative. The company has pursued several initiatives to minimize its environmental impact and introduce alternative sources of energy.

“Greening the Fleet” initiatives include:

- Hybrid Technology: To date almost 400 hybrid electric vehicles (HEVs) have been integrated into Purolator's fleet. Each HEV provides a reduction in greenhouse gas emissions, and a 30-35 percent savings on fossil fuel burns. The company plans to integrate up to 2,000 HEVs into its fleet over the next several years.
- Electric Vehicle Prototype: Purolator is currently testing a battery-operated electric delivery vehicle, known as the “Quicksider.” The vehicle, which reduces up to 85 percent of greenhouse gases and smog-causing emissions, was tested on the city streets of Toronto. The Quicksider is planned for use in urban settings, where delivery vehicles make numerous stops throughout the day. The Quicksider was on display during the 2010 Winter Olympic Games in Vancouver.
- Delivery route efficiencies: Every year the company undertakes a “route optimization” process to ensure that routes are as streamlined and efficient as possible, and to reveal any redundant or unnecessary routes. The optimization system, first initiated in 2000, has generated a 10 to 15 percent reduction in the company's overall number of routes.
- No-idling policy: A “no-idling” policy mandates that trucks be turned off during stops.
