= Oil filter =

Filter designed to remove contaminants from oil

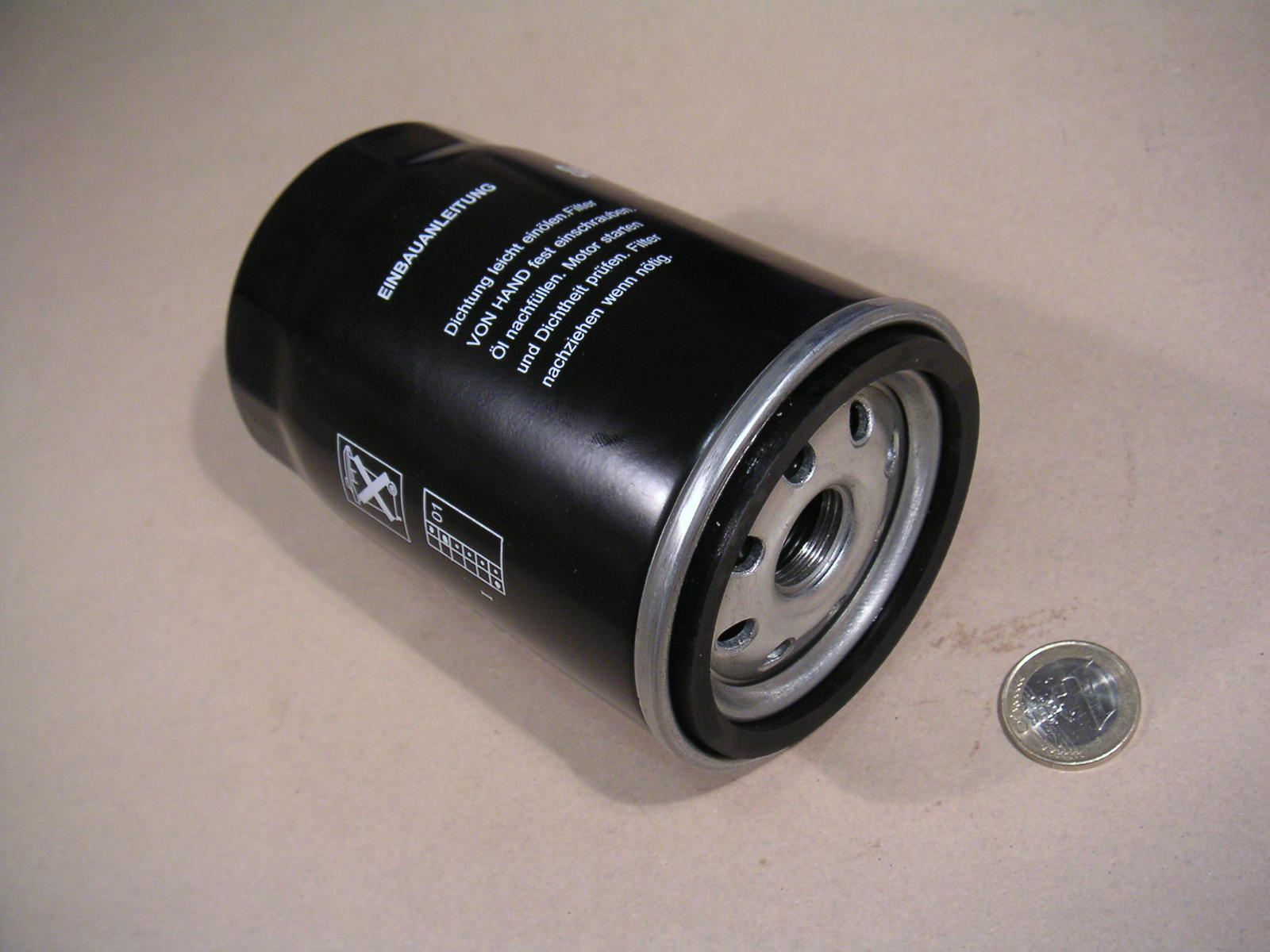
Spin-on oil filter, showing annular seal and screw-on thread

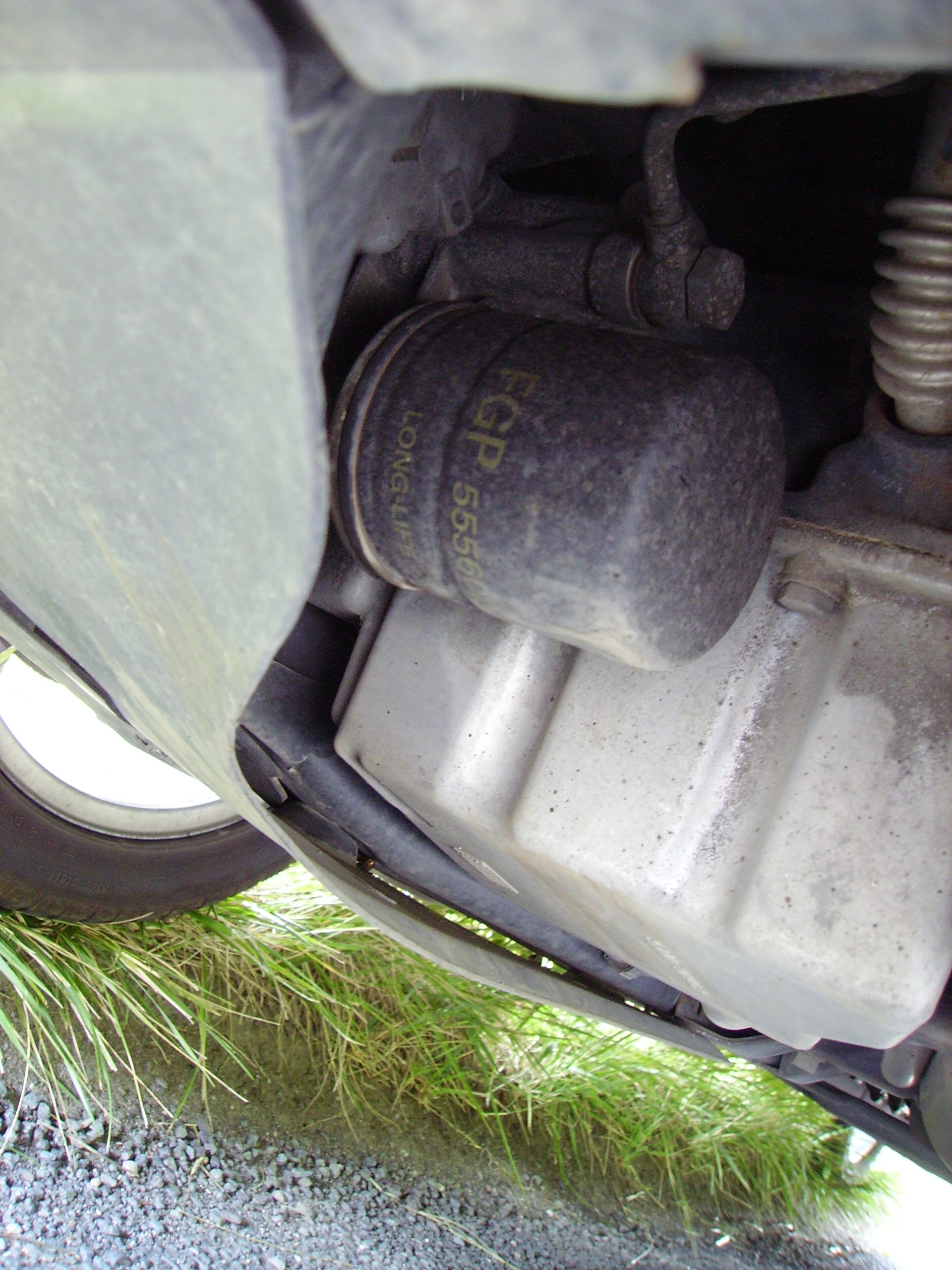
Spin-on oil filter on a Saab

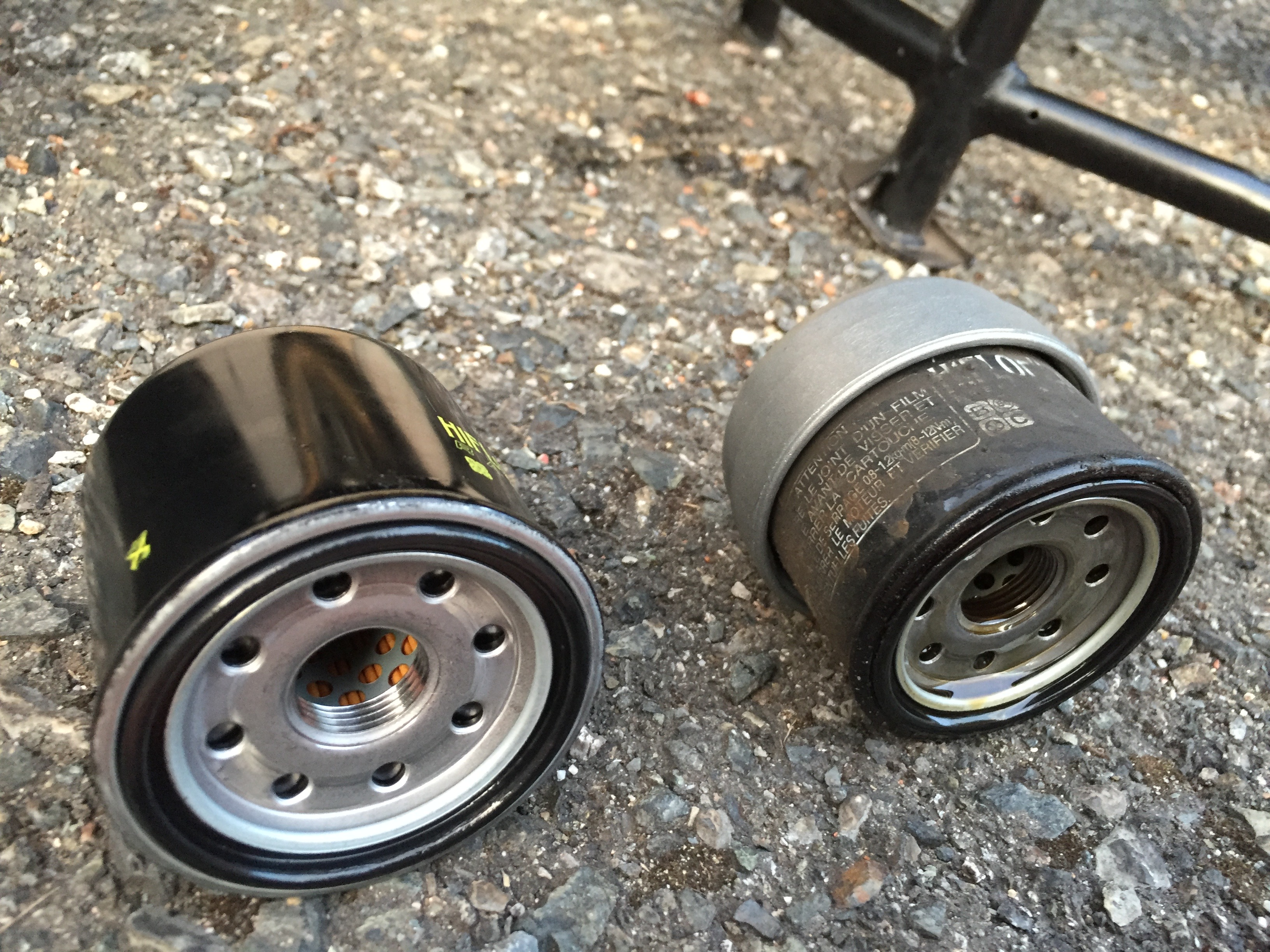
New (left) and used (right) motorcycle oil filters

An oil filter is a filter designed to remove contaminants from engine oil, transmission oil, lubricating oil, or hydraulic oil. Their chief use is in internal-combustion engines for motor vehicles (both on- and off-road ), powered aircraft, railway locomotives, ships and boats, and static engines such as generators and pumps. Other vehicle hydraulic systems, such as those in automatic transmissions and power steering, are often equipped with an oil filter. Gas turbine engines, such as those on jet aircraft, also require the use of oil filters. Oil filters are used in many different types of hydraulic machinery. The oil industry itself employs filters for oil production, oil pumping, and oil recycling. Modern engine oil filters tend to be "full-flow" (inline) or "bypass".

== History ==
Early automobile engines did not have oil filters, having only a rudimentary mesh sieve placed at the oil pump intake. Consequently, along with the generally low quality of oil available, very frequent oil changes were required. The Purolator oil filter was the first oil filter for the automobile; it revolutionized the filtration industry, and is still in production today. The Purolator was a bypass filter, whereby most of the oil was pumped from the oil sump directly to the engine's working parts, while a smaller proportion of the oil was sent through the filter via a second flow path, filtering the oil over time.

== Bypass and full-flow ==
=== Full-flow ===
A full-flow system will have a pump which sends pressurised oil through a filter to the engine bearings, after which the oil returns by gravity to the sump. In the case of a dry sump engine, the oil that reaches the sump is evacuated by a second pump to a remote oil tank. The function of the full-flow filter is to protect the engine from wear through abrasion.

=== Bypass ===
Modern bypass oil filter systems are secondary systems whereby a bleed from the main oil pump supplies oil to the bypass filter, the oil then passing not to the engine but returning to the sump or oil tank. The purpose of the bypass is to have a secondary filtration system to keep the oil in good condition, free of dirt, soot and water, providing much smaller particle retention than is practical for full flow filtration. The full-flow filter is still used to prevent any excessively large particles from causing substantial abrasion or acute blockage in the engine. Originally used on commercial and industrial diesel engines with large oil capacities where the cost of oil analysis testing and extra filtration to extended oil change intervals makes economic sense; bypass oil filters are becoming more common in private consumer applications. (It is essential that the bypass does not compromise the pressurised oilfeed within the full-flow system; one way to avoid such compromise is to have the bypass system as completely independent).

== Pressure relief valves ==
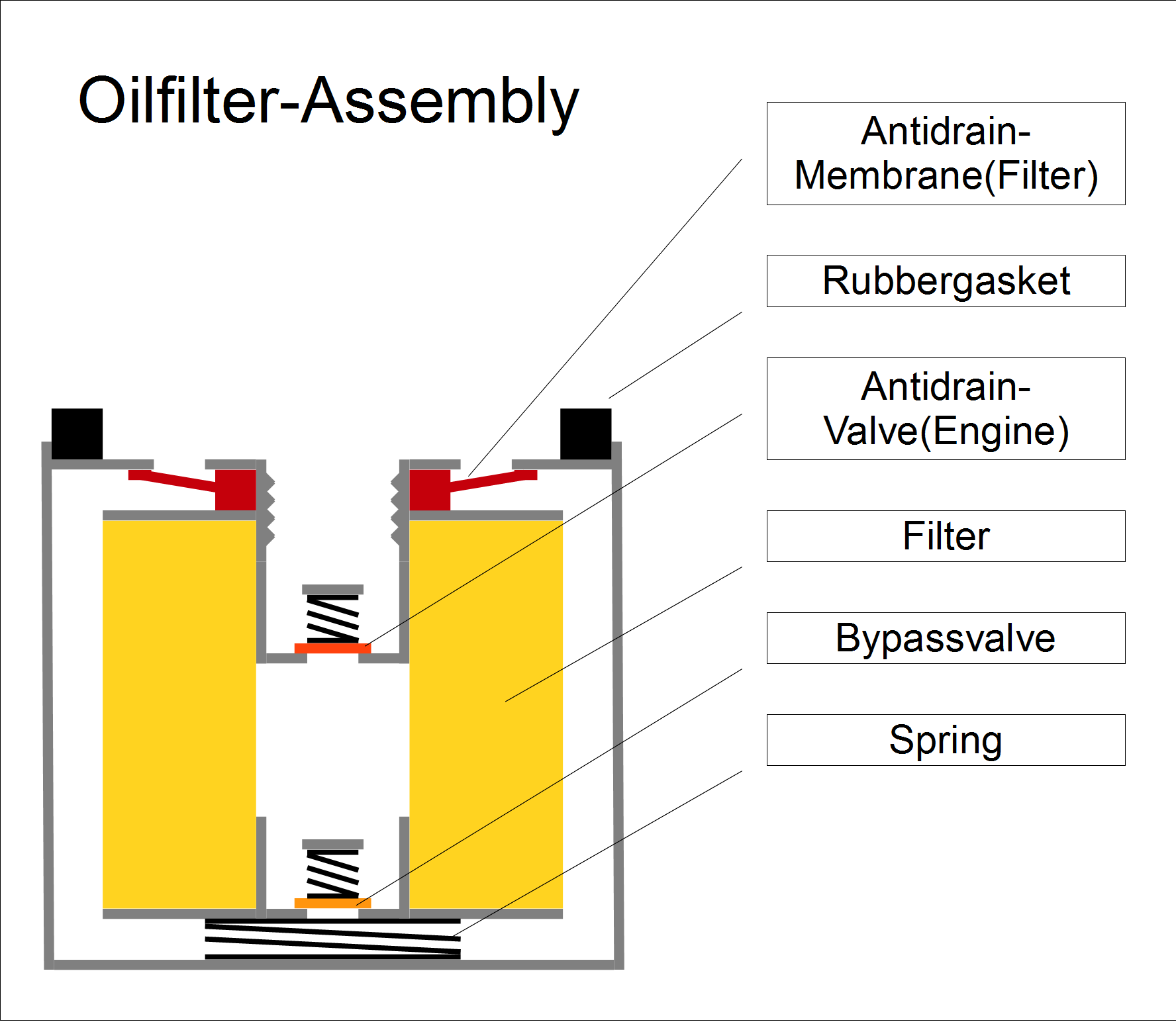
Oil-filter cartridge, internal construction.

Most pressurized lubrication systems incorporate an overpressure relief valve to allow oil to bypass the filter if its flow restriction is excessive, to protect the engine from oil starvation. Filter bypass may occur if the filter is clogged or the oil is thickened by cold weather. The overpressure relief valve is frequently incorporated into the oil filter. Filters mounted such that oil tends to drain from them usually incorporate an anti-drainback valve to hold oil in the filter after the engine (or other lubrication system) is shut down. This is done to avoid a delay in oil pressure buildup once the system is restarted; without an anti-drainback valve, pressurized oil would have to fill the filter before travelling onward to the engine's working parts. This situation can cause premature wear of moving parts due to initial lack of oil.

== Types of oil filter ==
=== Mechanical ===
Mechanical designs employ an element made of bulk material (such as cotton waste) or pleated Filter paper to entrap and sequester suspended contaminants. As material builds up on (or in) the filtration medium, oil flow is progressively restricted. This requires periodic replacement of the filter element (or the entire filter, if the element is not separately replaceable).

==== Cartridge and spin-on ====
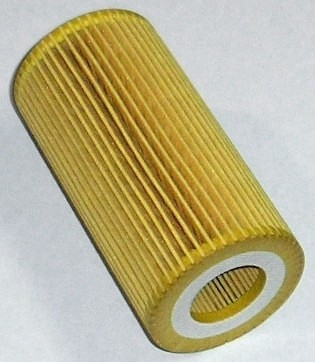
Replacement paper filter element for a Volvo

Early engine oil filters were of cartridge (or replaceable element) construction, in which a permanent housing contains a replaceable filter element or cartridge. The housing is mounted either directly on the engine or remotely with supply and return pipes connecting it to the engine. In the mid-1950s, the spin-on oil filter design was introduced: a self-contained housing and element assembly which was to be unscrewed from its mount, discarded, and replaced with a new one. This made filter changes more convenient and potentially less messy, and quickly came to be the dominant type of oil filter installed by the world's automakers. Conversion kits were offered for vehicles originally equipped with cartridge-type filters. In the 1990s, European and Asian automakers in particular began to shift back in favor of replaceable-element filter construction, because it generates less waste with each filter change. American automakers have likewise begun to shift to replaceable-cartridge filters, and retrofit kits to convert from spin-on to cartridge-type filters are offered for popular applications. Commercially available automotive oil filters vary in their design, materials, and construction details. Ones that are made from completely synthetic material excepting the metal drain cylinders contained within are far superior and longer lasting than the traditional cardboard/cellulose/paper type that still predominate. These variables affect the efficacy, durability, and cost of the filter.

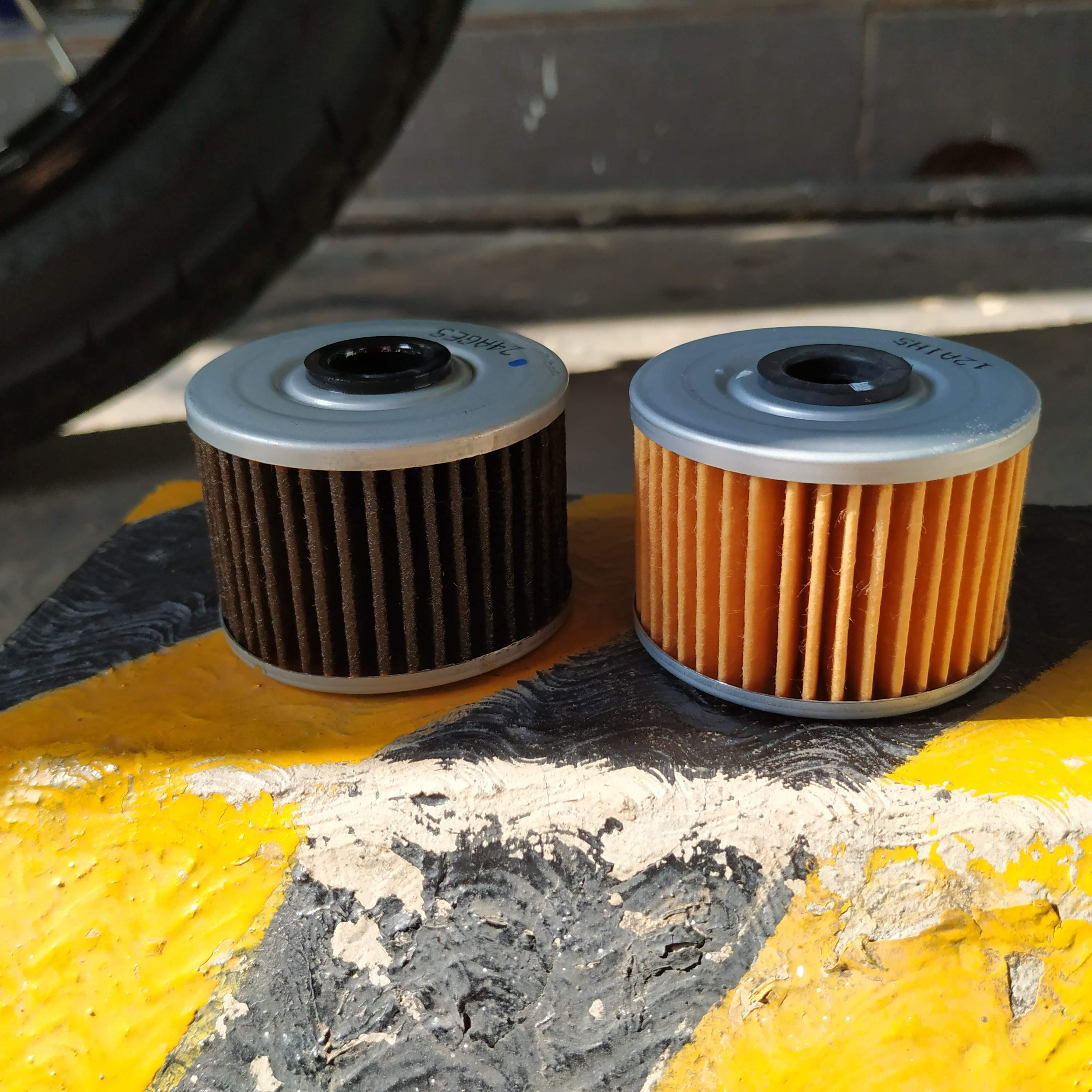
Motorcycle oil filters on Kawasaki W175. Old (left) and new (right).

=== Magnetic ===
Magnetic filters use a permanent magnet or an electromagnet to capture ferromagnetic particles. An advantage of magnetic filtration is that maintaining the filter simply requires cleaning the particles from the surface of the magnet. Automatic transmissions in vehicles frequently have a magnet in the fluid pan to sequester magnetic particles and prolong the life of the media-type fluid filter. Some companies are manufacturing magnets that attach to the outside of an oil filter or magnetic drain plugs—first invented and offered for cars and motorcycles in the mid-1930s—to aid in capturing these metallic particles, though there is ongoing debate as to the effectiveness of such devices.

=== Sedimentation ===
A sedimentation or gravity bed filter allows contaminants heavier than oil to settle to the bottom of a container under the influence of gravity.

=== Centrifugal ===
A centrifuge oil cleaner is a rotary sedimentation device using centrifugal force rather than gravity to separate contaminants from the oil, in the same manner as any other centrifuge. Pressurized oil enters the center of the housing and passes into a drum rotor free to spin on a bearing and seal. The rotor has two jet nozzles arranged to direct a stream of oil at the inner housing to rotate the drum. The oil then slides to the bottom of the housing wall, leaving particulate oil contaminants stuck to the housing walls. The housing must periodically be cleaned, or the particles will accumulate to such a thickness as to stop the drum rotating. In this condition, unfiltered oil will be recirculated. Advantages of the centrifuge are: (i) that the cleaned oil may separate from any water which, being heavier than oil, settles at the bottom and can be drained off (provided any water has not emulsified with the oil); and (ii) they are much less likely to become blocked than a conventional filter. If the oil pressure is insufficient to spin the centrifuge, it may instead by driven mechanically or electrically.

Note: some spin-off filters are described as centrifugal but they are not true centrifuges; rather, the oil is directed in such a way that there is a centrifugal swirl that helps contaminants stick to the outside of the filter.

=== High efficiency (HE) ===
High efficiency oil filters are a type of bypass filter that are claimed to allow extended oil drain intervals. HE oil filters typically have pore sizes of 3 micrometres, which studies have shown reduce engine wear. Some fleets have been able to increase their drain intervals up to 5-10 times.

== Filter placement in an oil system ==
Deciding how clean the oil needs to be is important as cost increases rapidly with cleanliness. Having determined the optimum target cleanliness level for a contamination control programme, many engineers are then challenged by the process of optimizing the location of the filter. To ensure effective solid particle ingression balance, the engineer must consider various elements such as whether the filter will be for protection or for contamination control, ease of access for maintenance, and the performance of the unit being considered to meet the challenges of the target set.

== See also ==
- Air filter
- Fuel filter
- Impingement filter
- List of auto parts
- Oil-filter wrench
