= Broadcast reference monitor =

Specialized video display

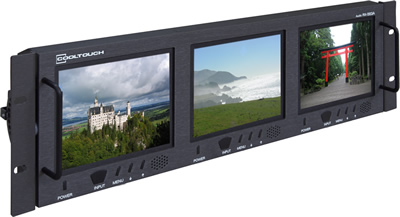
Rack-mounted video monitors as used in television broadcasting

A video reference monitor, also called a broadcast reference monitor or just reference monitor, is a specialized display device similar to a television set, used to monitor the output of a video-generating device, such as playout from a video server, IRD, video camera, VCR, or DVD player. It may or may not have professional audio monitoring capability. Unlike a television set, a video monitor has no tuner and, as such, is unable independently to tune into an over-the-air broadcast like a television receiver. One common use of video monitors is in television stations, television studios, production trucks and in outside broadcast vehicles, where broadcast engineers use them for confidence checking of analog signal and digital signals throughout the system. They can also be used for color grading if calibrated, during post-production. Banks of reference monitors are also a common sight on the sets of newscasts, showing internal or external feeds.

Common display types for video monitors

- Cathode-ray tube
- Liquid crystal display
- Plasma display
- OLED

Common monitoring formats for security

- Composite video
- S-Video

== Broadcast reference monitor ==
Broadcast reference monitors must be used for video compliance at television or television studio facilities, because they do not perform any video enhancements and try to produce as accurate an image as possible. For quality control purposes, it is necessary for a broadcast reference monitor to produce (reasonably) consistent images from facility to facility, to reveal any flaws in the material, and also not to introduce any image artifacts (such as aliasing) that is not in the source material. Broadcast monitors will try to avoid post processing such as a video scaler, line doubling and any image enhancements such as dynamic contrast. However, display technologies with fixed pixel structures (e.g. LCD, plasma) must perform image scaling when displaying SD signals as the signal contains non-square pixels while the display has square pixels. LCDs and plasmas are also inherently progressive displays and may need to perform deinterlacing on interlaced video signals.

Some professional video broadcast monitors display information on screen such as the current video signal format they might be receiving i.e.: standard-definition formats like 576i, 480i or high definition formats like 720p or 1080p. They also have mechanical buttons to toggle common aspect ratios like (4:3 or 16:9), and underscanning or overscanning a picture to see lines in the vertical blanking interval (VBI) of video, and check if subtitles in VBI were inserted properly or not. Modern broadcast grade professional monitors also have safe area grid generators, to help position television graphics such as lower thirds within their respective areas i.e. graphics safe, title safe or action safe.

Common monitoring formats for broadcasters

- Component video
- Composite video
- Serial digital interface (SDI, as SD-SDI or HD-SDI)

=== Features ===
Professional video monitors have various features that consumer monitors lack such as:

- Conforms to colorimetry standards such as the SMPTE C, Rec. 709, or EBU primaries.
- SDI inputs / outputs.
- AES/EBU Audio decoding.
- Genlock input.
- GPI interface – for receiving external triggers.
- Modular expansion card slots that support SD-SDI or HD-SDI single link or dual-link HD-SDI cards.
- Safe area cage.
- Rack mountable.

== See also ==
- Composite monitor
- Computer monitor
