= Purolator Filters =

American automotive filter manufacturer

MANN+HUMMEL Purolator Filters LLC
- Trade name: Purolator
- Formerly: Motor Improvements, Incorporated; Purolator Products Company
- Type: Subsidiary
- Founded: 1923; 103 years ago in New York, New York, United States
- Headquarters: Fayetteville, North Carolina, United States
- Products: Oil filters; Air filters; Fuel filters
- Parent: Facet Enterprises (1987-1990); Pennzoil (1990-1992); Mark IV Industries (1994-1999); Arvin Industries (1999-2006); Bosch and Mann+Hummel (2006-2013); Mann+Hummel (since 2013)
- Website: www.purolatornow.com

MANN+HUMMEL Purolator Filters LLC, more commonly known as Purolator, is an American manufacturer of oil and air filters, based in Fayetteville, North Carolina. Since 2013, it has been a subsidiary of German filter manufacturer Mann+Hummel. Purolator manufactured and sold the first commercially available automotive oil filters starting in the 1920s. For several decades in the late 20th Century, Purolator operated a large North American courier business known as Purolator Couriers. Canadian courier Purolator Inc. and its subsidiary Purolator International are the successors of that business but have had no direct relationship with their former parent since 1987.

== History ==
=== Foundation and early history ===
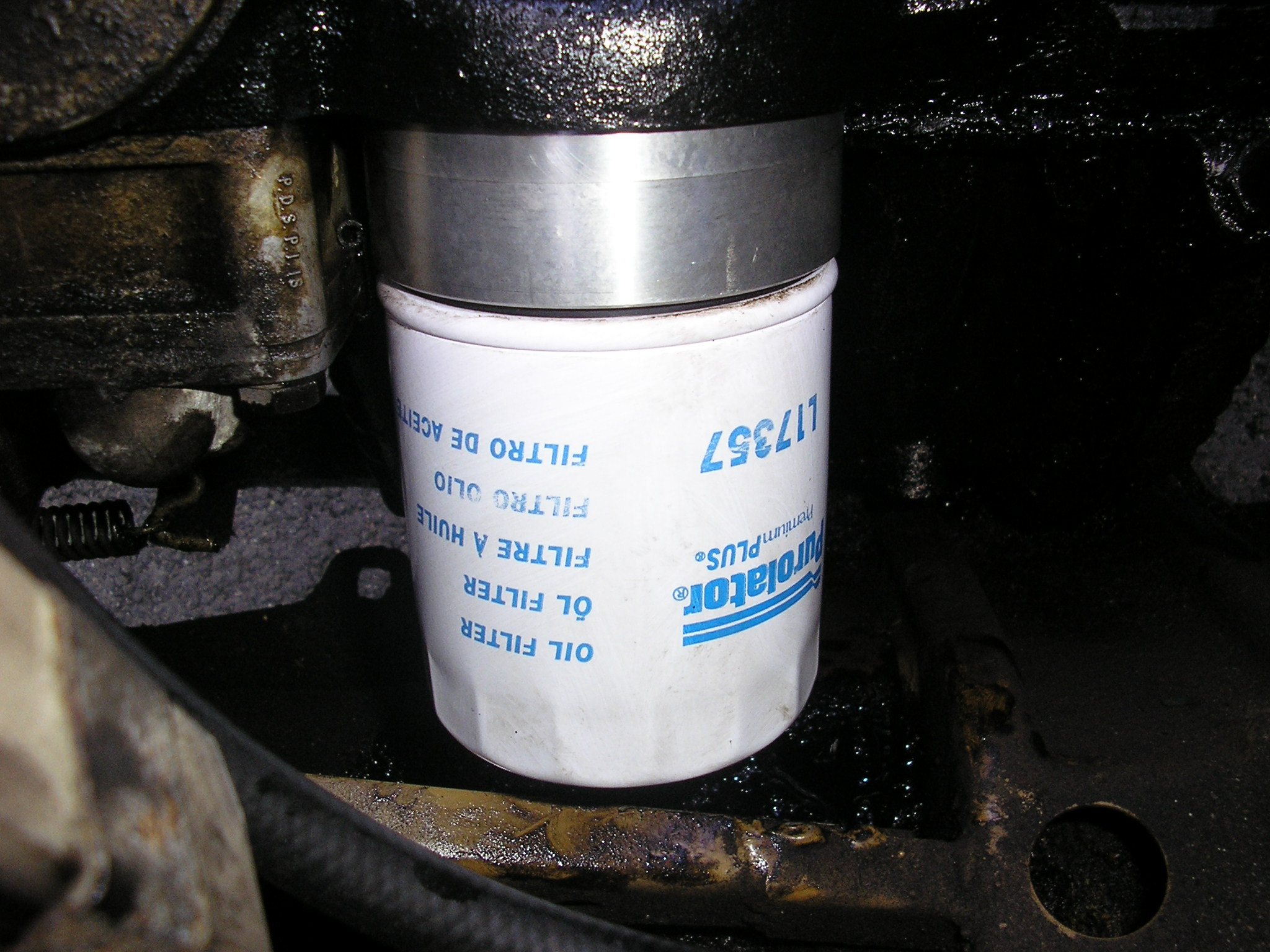
A modern Purolator oil filter

The company was founded in 1923 as Motor Improvements, Incorporated in New York City. The company's Purolator (initially stylized PurOlator and sometimes Pur-O-Lator) oil filtration device, invented in 1922 by Ernest John Sweetland and George H. Greenhalgh, was standard equipment on early 1920s Chrysler automobiles after being launched on the Chrysler Six. The name Purolator was a portmanteau of pure oil later. The Purolator was the first modern automotive oil filter and reduced the need to flush a car's crankcase to clean out oil contaminants, at the time a regular and costly maintenance item.

In 1924, Purolator filters were made available for retail sale for both passenger cars and trucks and Motor Improvements president James A. Abeles announced it had established a network of 2,600 sales, installation, and service stations across the US and Canada and had engaged ad firm MacManus, Inc. for a nationwide advertising campaign.

The company later changed its name to the name of its most well-known brand, Purolator Products, Inc..

=== Diversification ===
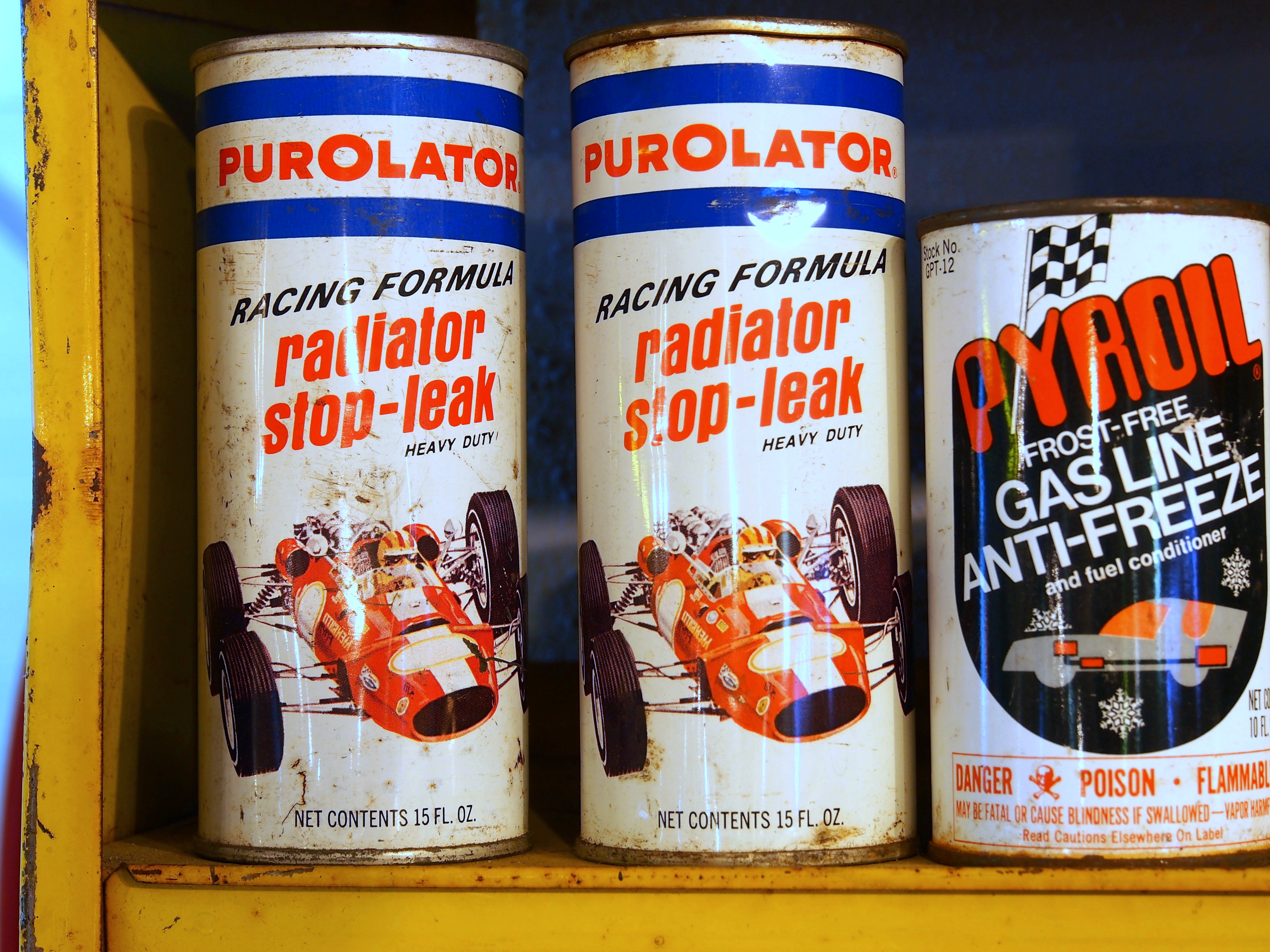
Various Purolator products

In the 1950s and 1960s, Purolator, headquartered in Rahway, New Jersey, diversified their operations by acquiring a variety of hardware and automotive parts manufacturers. These included Bridgeport Manufacturing Co. in 1959 and in 1961, Hadbar, Inc. and On Mark Couplings, Inc. both of Los Angeles, California. Among its acquisitions in 1965 was Stant Inc., a Pine Bluff, Arkansas manufacturer of radiator and fuel caps which continued as an independent subsidiary of Purolator.

==== US courier operations ====
In 1967, Purolator expanded into the courier business by acquiring American Courier Corp. (ACC) of Bayside, New York for over US$5 million. ACC operated as an independent subsidiary of Purolator. ACC had been founded as Armored Car Service in 1948 and its primary business was transporting checks between banks. Following the acquisition by Purolator, ACC made a number of acquisitions aimed at consolidating its business nationwide including the 1969 acquisitions of both Fort Worth, Texas-based Armored Motor Services, Inc. and Tampa, Florida-based Security Transport Corp. By 1971, ACC said it had 1,272 vehicles and had started a Sky Courier division with 17 planes and 30 pilots. ACC was renamed Purolator Courier Corp. in 1973.

==== Canadian courier operations ====
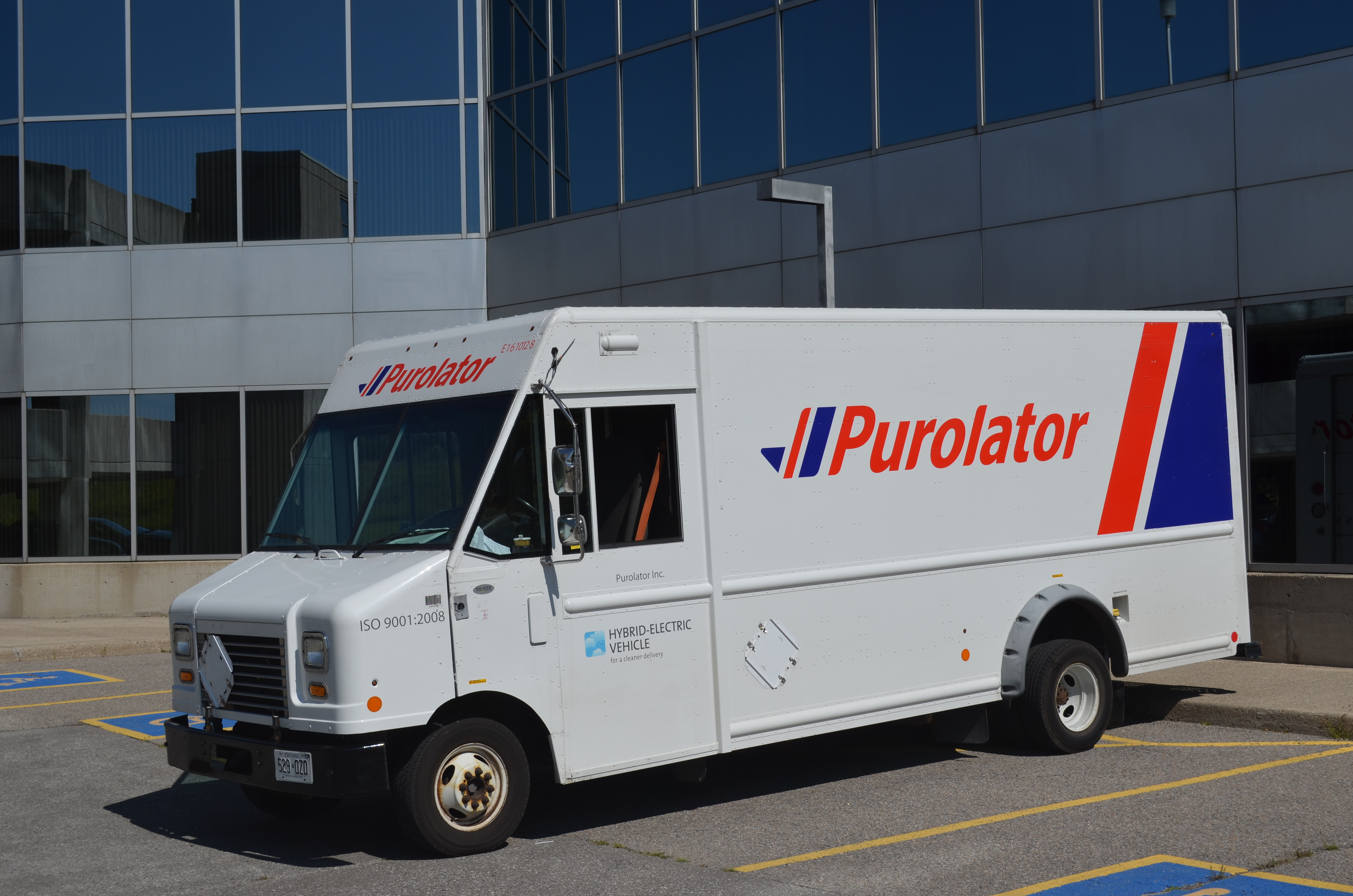
Purolator delivery vehicle in Canada. Purolator's Canadian courier business continued as Purolator Inc.

Purolator Courier bought Trans Canadian Couriers in 1972 to expand its Canadian reach. In 1973, Trans Canadian was renamed Purolator Courier, Ltd.

=== Reorganization ===
In 1982, William Waltrip resigned as president and CEO of Pan Am after less than a year to become president and CEO of Purolator. Waltrip's major initiative was to refocus the company on its courier business. To that end, in 1983 Purolator sold Purolator Armored, its armored car division formerly Purolator Security, to Australian armored car service provider and owner of Loomis Armored Car Service, Mayne Nickless for US$33 million. By the end of 1983, Purolator operated 270 terminals, 111 aircraft, and 5,328 ground vehicles and reported it had handled 76,841 packages in the year.

In April 1984, parent company Purolator Inc. was merged with subsidiary Purolator Services and US courier subsidiary Purolator Courier Corp. to form a new company, Purolator Courier, Inc. It also consolidated the parent company headquarters, previously in Piscataway, New Jersey, and the Courier's headquarters, previously in Long Island, New York, to a single facility in Basking Ridge, New Jersey. At the same time, Purolator began to move to compete with package delivery companies United Parcel Service and Federal Express by announcing it would introduce a two-day service it called Standard Service in 1985. While revenue rose in the third quarter of 1984, earnings declined due to the company's heavy investment in new equipment as it continued expansion of its courier business. At the time, Purolator's air and ground courier businesses accounted for 75% of the company's US$800 million revenue, far eclipsing the original automotive manufacturing business.

=== Breakup ===
By 1987, Purolator was experiencing significant financial challenges having reported losses of US$57.6 million on US$841.4 million in revenue for the previous year. The company had spent significant capital building an air fleet in previous years, an endeavor that analysts partially blamed for its financial decline.

Following the 1983 sale of Purolator Armored and Purolator's 1984 restructuring, the parent company was the US courier business, Purolator Courier, Inc. Its major subsidiaries were Purolator Products, the original auto filter business, Purolator Courier Ltd., the Canadian courier business, and radiator and fuel cap manufacturer Stant. Unable to maintain its operations, the company was broken up in a series of transactions all occurring in 1987.

- Purolator Products was sold to filter manufacturer Facet Enterprises for about US$167 million.
- Purolator Courier Ltd. was sold to Onex Capital Corp. for US$170 million. In 1993, Onex sold 75% of Purolator Courier to Canada Post for CA$24 million, a holding later increased to over 90% in 1998. In 2011 Purolator Courier Ltd. changed its name to Purolator Inc..
- Purolator Courier Inc., the parent company, was acquired by Emery Air Freight. For Emery, the acquisition of Purolator was financially troublesome and led in part to Emery's 1989 acquisition by Consolidated Freightways for US$230 million. Within 30 days of the acquisition, Emery and Purolator Courier had been merged with Consolidated's CF AirFreight to become a single entity, Emery Worldwide, with all former brands including Purolator retired.
- Stant was sold with the parent company to Emery. However, Stant was bought out by a management-led group in a leveraged buyout later in 1987. It was independent until 1997 after which it has been owned first by Tomkins plc then, since 2008, H.I.G. Capital.

=== Purolator Products ===
Following its acquisition by Facet, Purolator Products's headquarters were moved from Edison, New Jersey to Tulsa, Oklahoma where Facet's existing filter subsidiary, Facet Automotive Filter Co., was based. Purolator's manufacturing facilities in Fayetteville, North Carolina and Mississauga, Ontario were not moved.

In 1988, Facet and its subsidiaries including Purolator were acquired by Pennzoil for US$254 million after having been the target of hostile bidder, Prospect Group. The next year, Facet merged Purolator with Facet Automotive Filter under the name Purolator Products Inc. The resulting subsidiary was expected to be the world's largest automotive filter company and hold a 30% share of the US market.

In February 1990, Pennzoil put Facet up for sale having been unable to realize expected synergies from the filter manufacturer. However, by April, Purolator had been merged with Facet which was renamed Purolator Products Company and Pennzoil reported it was no longer looking for a buyer. Two years later, Pennzoil spun Purolator off as an independent, publicly traded company via an IPO.

In 1994, Purolator was acquired by engineering company Mark IV Industries of Amherst, New York for a reported US$273 million.

In 1999, Mark IV sold the automotive filter business, Purolator Products, to Columbus, Indiana-based automotive component manufacturer Arvin Industries for US$276 million. At the time, Purolator reported US$345 million in annual sales. Later in the year, Mark IV sold its remaining Purolator and Facet units, industrial filter businesses Purolator Products Air Filtration Company, Facet International, and Purolator-Facet Filter Products, to industrial filter manufacturer Clarcor for US$144.8 million.

In 2006, Arvin, then known as ArvinMeritor, sold Purolator Filters to a joint venture of European filter manufacturers Mann+Hummel and Bosch. Mann+Hummel bought out Bosch's 50% share of their joint venture in Purolator Filters in 2013 taking full ownership of Purolator and renaming it MANN+HUMMEL Purolator Filters.

== Products ==
As of August 2021, Purolator sells four categories of automotive filters:

- Oil filters
- Air filters
- Cabin air filters
- Fuel filters

== NASCAR sponsorship ==
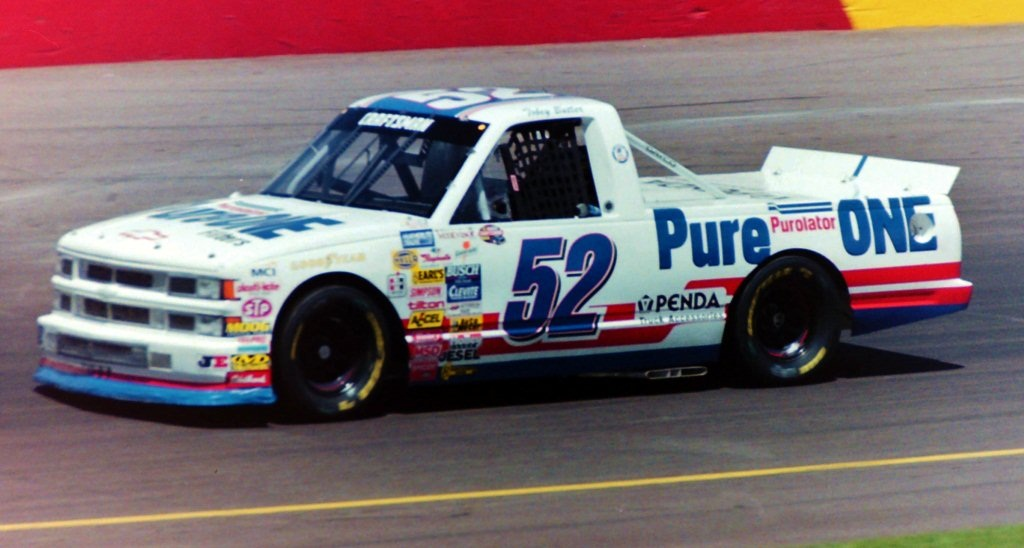
Purolator-sponsored Schrader Racing Chevrolet in 1997

Purolator's involvement with NASCAR dates to 1955 when it offered a US$7,000 prize for NASCAR Grand National race circuit winners who raced using Purolator oil filters. By 1970, it was sponsoring NASCAR Cup Series team Holman-Moody with driver David Pearson, winner of multiple Grand National Championships. In 1972, Pearson joined Purolator-sponsored Wood Brothers Racing with drivers Neil Bonnett and A. J. Foyt. In 1974, Purolator sponsored the inaugural 500-mile NASCAR Grand National race at Pocono International Raceway, the Purolator 500. The company continued the sponsorship in 1975 and 1976. Purolator Products sponsored and won the 1990 Daytona 500 with Derrike Cope as the driver.

== See also ==
- Media related to Purolator Filters at Wikimedia Commons
- Pennzoil - Oil company and former Purolator parent
- Purolator 500 (Pocono) - Inaugural NASCAR Grand National race at Pocono Raceway in 1974
- Purolator 500 (Atlanta) - NASCAR Grand National race sponsored by Purolator in the 1990s
- Robert Bosch GmbH - Major German automotive parts manufacturer and former Purolator parent
