= Mark IV Industries =

Automotive component manufacturer based in New York

Mark IV Industries, Inc., headquartered in Amherst, New York, is a manufacturer of automotive components. The company is known for power and fluid transfer products that are used primarily in automotive and industrial businesses. It also introduced eco-friendly products that include air admission and cooling, lighting technologies, power transmission, and advanced radio frequency and information displays. The company, which had annual revenues of $1.34 billion in 2009, operates in 16 countries, employing over 4,200 people.

== History ==
Mark IV Industries was one of the region's fastest-growing companies in the 1990s. At its peak, it operated 37 manufacturing facilities, 26 distribution outlets, and 9 technical centers around the world. Recently, however, the company has struggled with high debt loads. In April 2009, the company filed for bankruptcy protection from creditors, listing assets of $500 million and debt of more than $1 billion. After six-months in Chapter 11, Mark IV had eliminated approximately $750 million in debt and liabilities, and emerged in November 2009 as a newly reorganized company. The company has, however, found itself at the adverse end of a legal trend which strongly enforces environmental protection, as a judge of the Southern District of New York has found that the government’s right to an injunction to force an environmental cleanup is not a claim that can be discharged under the Bankruptcy Code.

== See also ==
- Dayco Products
- Conrac
