= D2B =

D2B can mean:

- D2B (band), a Thai pop group
- D²B, a low-speed IEC serial bus standard for home automation applications
- Domestic Digital Bus (automotive), a high-speed isochronous ring network technology for automotive applications
- Dual 2-back, a variation of the n-back mental exercise
- IBM Db2, a database
