= Domestic Digital Bus =

Domestic Digital Bus may refer to:

- D²B, (IEC 61030) a low-speed IEC serial bus standard for home automation applications
- Domestic Digital Bus (automotive), a high-speed isochronous ring network technology for automotive applications
