= Mercedes-Benz COMAND =

In-car infotainment system

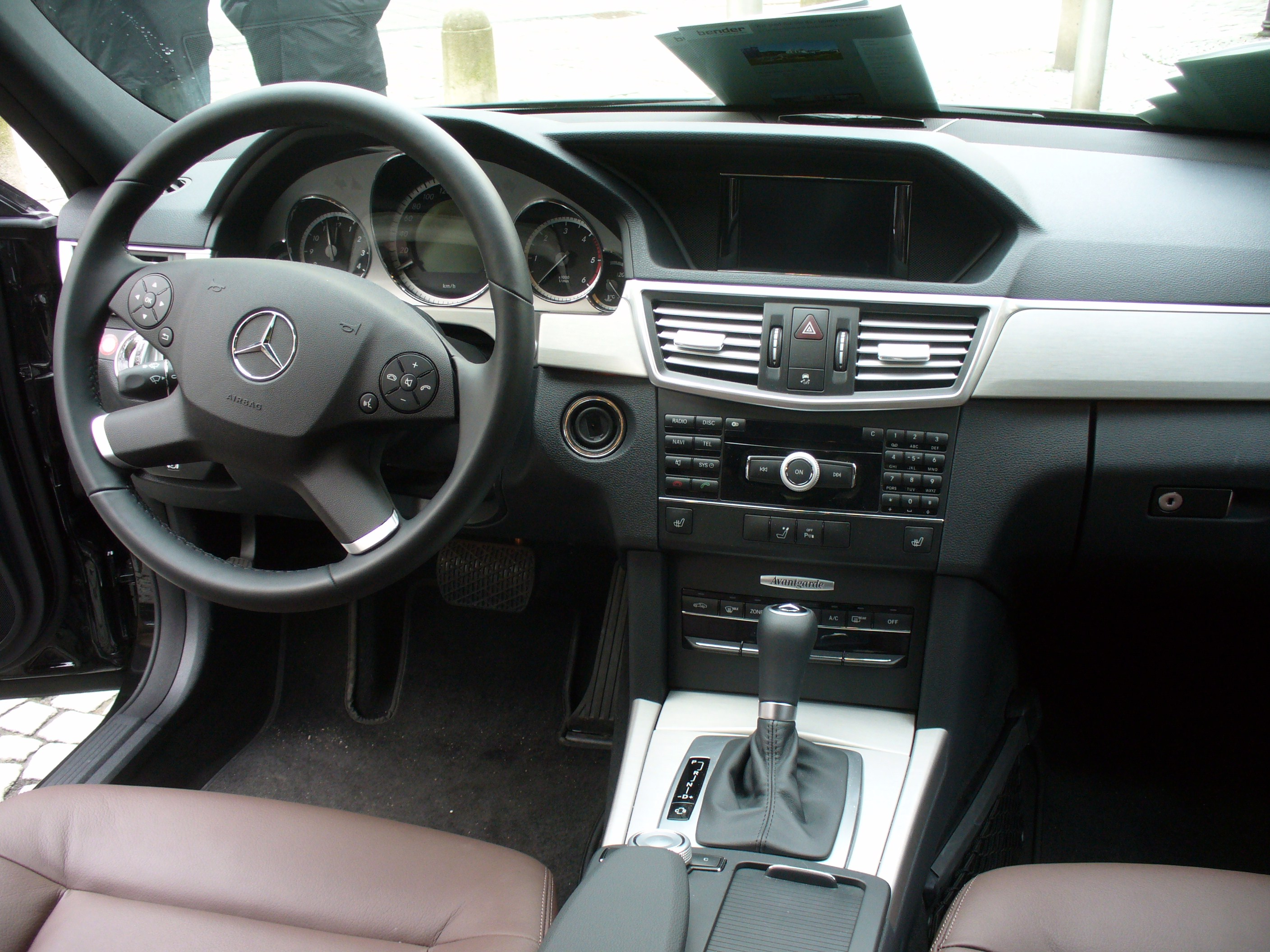
2010 E220 interior with COMAND Controller (below-left gear shift) and navigation screen

COMAND (Cockpit Management and Data system) is an in-car communications and entertainment system found on Mercedes-Benz vehicles.

COMAND features a dedicated flat display screen. It includes software features such as a GPS navigation system, address book, telephone, and radio. Various devices such as CD/DVD changers, sound system, TV receiver and the Linguatronic voice control system can be installed as additional options. The first generations of COMAND used the D2B optical network standard whereas later models are based on MOST.

COMAND systems provide integration between the various functions of the car such as multimedia, navigation and telephony. On vehicles with a Mercedes-Benz rear seat entertainment system, COMAND allows the rear seat displays to play content from the front system or from local sources like composite input.

On newer Mercedes models, COMAND can control other vehicle functions such as the HVAC system, seat controls, and interior lighting.

COMAND was introduced first on the S-Class and CL-Class models. Later, it became available on other Mercedes cars too.

== Model history ==
=== COMAND 2.5 ===
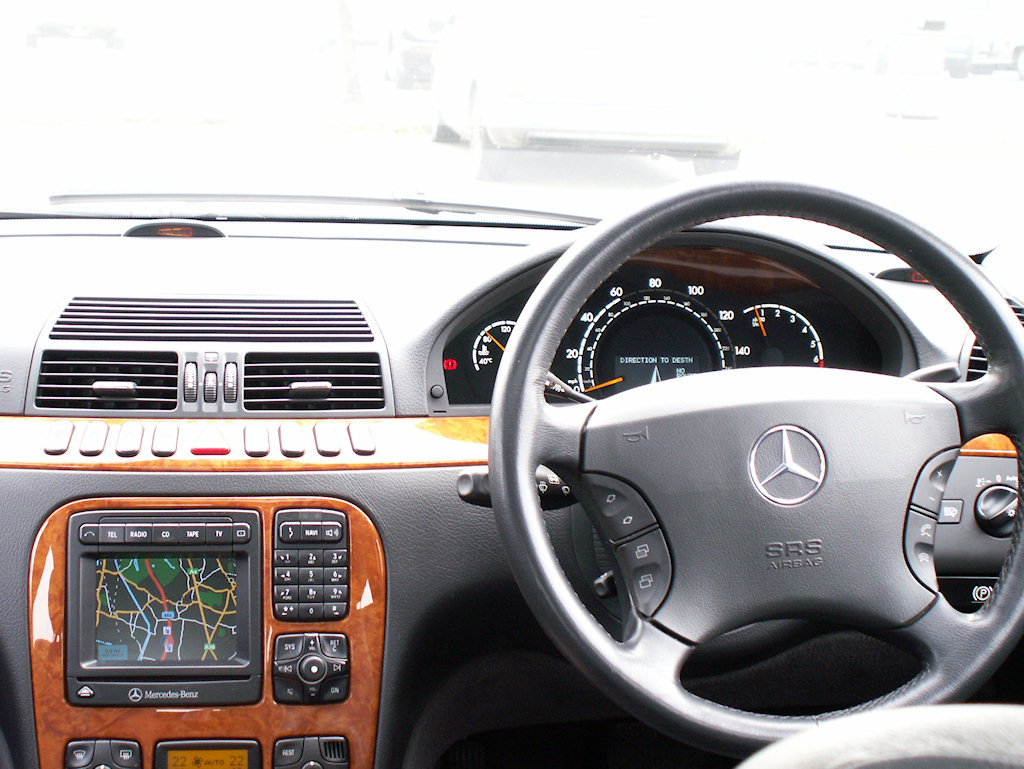
An early model UK-spec (right hand drive) W220 S-Class, with the COMAND system screen and buttons on the center console.

Somewhat confusingly, COMAND 2.5 (not to be confused with the much later (COMAND-APS NTG2.5) actually refers to the first generation of COMAND systems, introduced on the W220. The "2.5" label seems to refer to the fact that the main COMAND unit for this first generation had a height of 2.5 DIN. This COMAND system had a cassette drive, a built-in CD drive for the navigation map discs, an FM/AM radio tuner, a 4-channel amplifier and external connectors to other systems. The European models used Tele Atlas map discs (CD). Towards the end of 1999, the system was upgraded to use the improved DX type navigation discs. COMAND 2.5 uses a D2B optical bus for connection to the external CD changer, the telephone system, the optional Bose surround sound system and the optional Linguatronic voice control system. The COMAND 2.5 unit was made by Bosch.

COMAND 2.5 was an option on almost all models and denoted by Mercedes-Benz option code 352.

=== COMAND 2.0/COMAND 2.0 MOPF ===
The same COMAND 2.5 technology (with DX navigation maps) was later incorporated in a somewhat different form factor known as COMAND 2.0 (with "2.0" referring to the fact that this modified unit had a 2 DIN height), but with the cassette drive removed. These units were introduced on the W210 E-Class as rectangular units, and later introduced in a more rounded form on the W203 and R230 models, among other models.

From S-Class model year 2003, COMAND 2.5 was replaced by a widescreen version of COMAND 2.0 known as COMAND 2.0 MOPF.

Note that COMAND 2.5, COMAND 2.0 and COMAND 2.0 MOPF are collectively referred to as "COMAND 2" systems, despite these being the first generation COMAND systems and despite the successor being known as COMAND-APS NTG1.

=== COMAND-APS NTG1 ===
This new generation of COMAND systems was introduced on the model year 2002 W211 E-class and was a complete redesign. The D2B optical ring network was replaced by MOST. The Mercedes-Benz option code became 527 (although, confusingly, COMAND 2.0 MOPF was also given this option code). These new MOST based systems were given the name COMAND-APS to distinguish them from the older D2B systems.

The NTG1 system further distinguished itself from earlier models by having DVD based navigation instead of the CD based COMAND 2. This allowed a single disc to carry a whole region (such as Europe). NTG1 systems were also able to play MP3 CDs/DVDs.

=== COMAND-APS NTG2 ===
The NTG2 evolution was a cheaper and more integrated version of COMAND-APS, having all core components in the single double DIN head unit instead of three separate components as had been the case with NTG1 (an audio gateway including the radio, amplifier, and MOST controller; a head unit with display; and a navigation processor) and thereby also simplifying the wiring. However, unlike NTG1 models, the NTG2 COMAND was unable to play MP3 discs. To use the navigation at the same time as listening to an audio disc requires the optional CD changer.

This version of COMAND was used in various models such as the W203 C-Class and the W209 CLK and even the Vito/Viano. It was also fitted to the Smart Forfour.

=== COMAND-APS NTG3/NTG3.5 ===
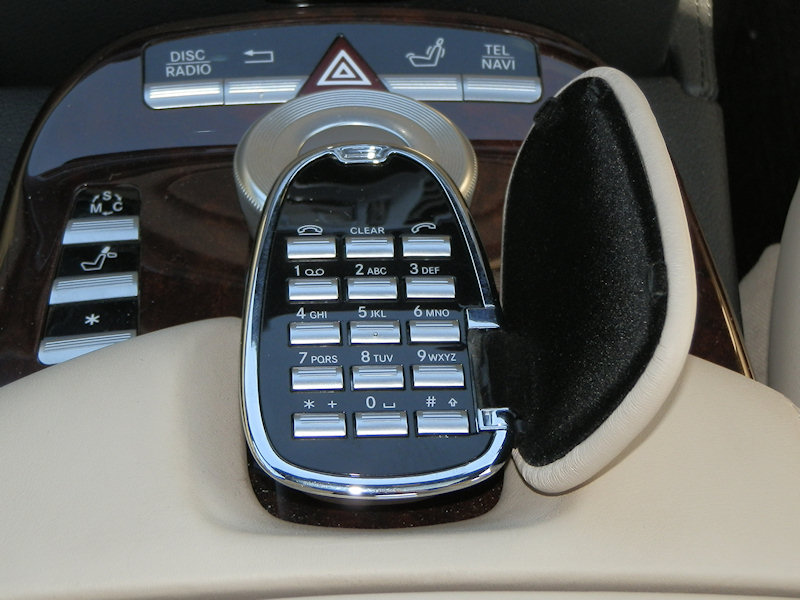
The rotary controller for COMAND-APS NTG3 together with the telephone keypad and quick access buttons. The button with the * symbol on the left is a programmable "favourite" button.

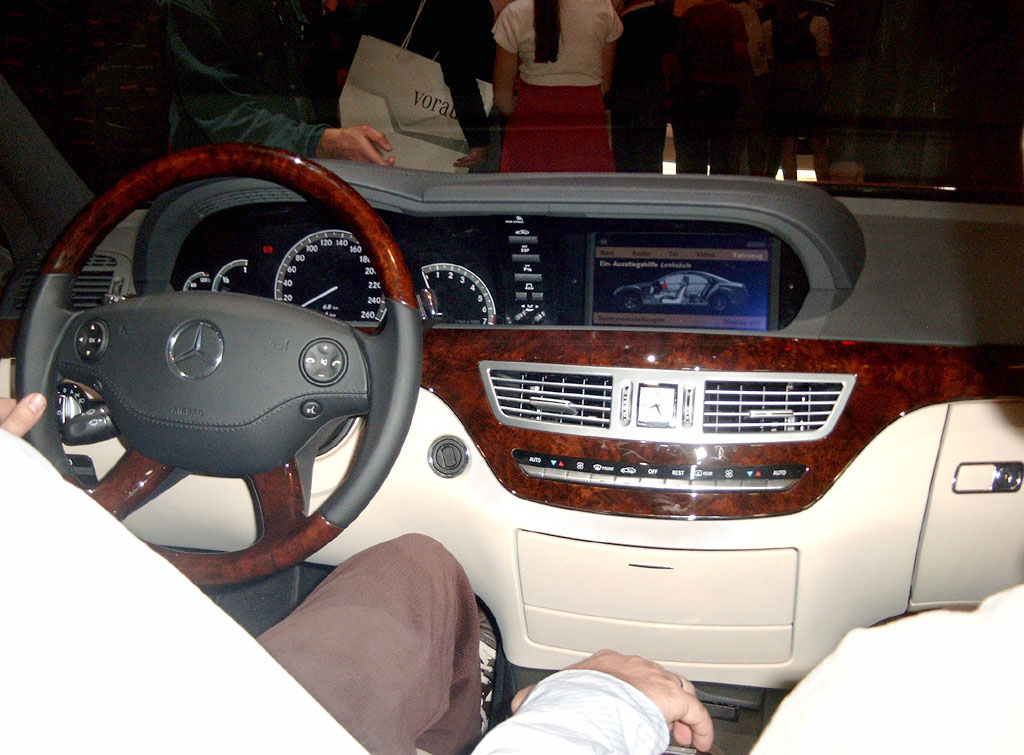
A W221 S-Class showing the location of the COMMAND screen to the right of the speedometer

Intended for the flagship W221 S-Class and the W216 CL-Class, COMAND NTG3 is a high-end system. Unlike for most other Mercedes-Benz cars, the S-Class and CL-Class from now on have COMAND as standard, allowing even better integration and for COMAND to operate even more vehicle functions. The navigation maps are stored on an internal hard disk instead of a DVD disc (although updates are installed from an update DVD). In addition to operating the audio, video, navigation and telecommunication systems, the NTG3 COMAND also controls a host of other features, such as the multi-contour and drive-dynamic seats, the HVAC system, the rear window shade, the vehicle locking, alarm and immobiliser, interior and exterior lighting functions, the optional ambient lighting feature, easy entry/exit settings, etc.

The NTG3 system comes with a large, high resolution 8" TFT 16:9 widescreen colour COMAND display mounted higher and more directly into the driver's line of sight and with a separate, large rotary controller mounted on the centre console in between the front seats. This system was the first COMAND to support DAB radio on the MOST bus.

NTG3 uses an in-dash DVD (and CD) changer and CompactFlash reader for MP3 music. A digital TV tuner and a Harman Kardon Logic7 stereo sound system with 14 speakers and a 600W 13-channel DSP amplifier can be optionally installed and controlled via COMAND. Where a factory fitted rear seat entertainment package is installed, this can use the NTG3 digital TV tuner and the surround sound system for playing out its audio over the speakers instead of headphones. As with previous models, Linguatronic voice command and control is available as an option too.

The main controller for NTG3 is a large rotary dial with haptic feedback, although there are also buttons for quick access to commonly used functions and even a "favourite" button that can be assigned a function of choice. In addition, buttons on the steering wheel give access to various COMAND functions too and the large screen in the instrument cluster can display various COMAND related settings and information in addition to the main COMAND display.

The model year 2009 W221 S-Class received an upgraded version, COMAND-APS 3.5 NTG. This includes improved Bluetooth support and split view (where the passenger watches a DVD while the driver sees other COMAND functions such as the navigation map on the same display). The new NTG3.5 system also features a new rights management provision to prevent the use of copied map update discs. This rights management function means it is not possible to upgrade NTG3 based vehicles to NTG3.5.

=== COMAND-APS NTG4 ===
The NTG4 system is a reduced cost version of NTG3 technology. It was first introduced when the W204 C-Class launched in 2007 and features a 7" screen, much smaller than the higher resolution, bigger 8" screen on the flagship W221. It is the first version of COMAND that supports the Mercedes Media Interface. Like NTG3, it stores maps on a hard disk and has a card reader for MP3 music. Amongst other implementation differences are the fact that in the W204 version the screen electrically folds in and out whereas in other incarnations it is fixed. The Mercedes SLS has COMAND NTG4 too.

Unlike the NTG3 system, NTG4 did not support 7 character UK postcodes when first released (only 5 character postcodes), but some NTG4 units (e.g. those in the MY2010 W212 and up) have a firmware upgrade available from Mercedes dealers which does add 7 character UK postcodes.

NTG4 is also used in Mercedes-Benz GLK-Class (X204).

=== COMAND-APS NTG2.5 ===
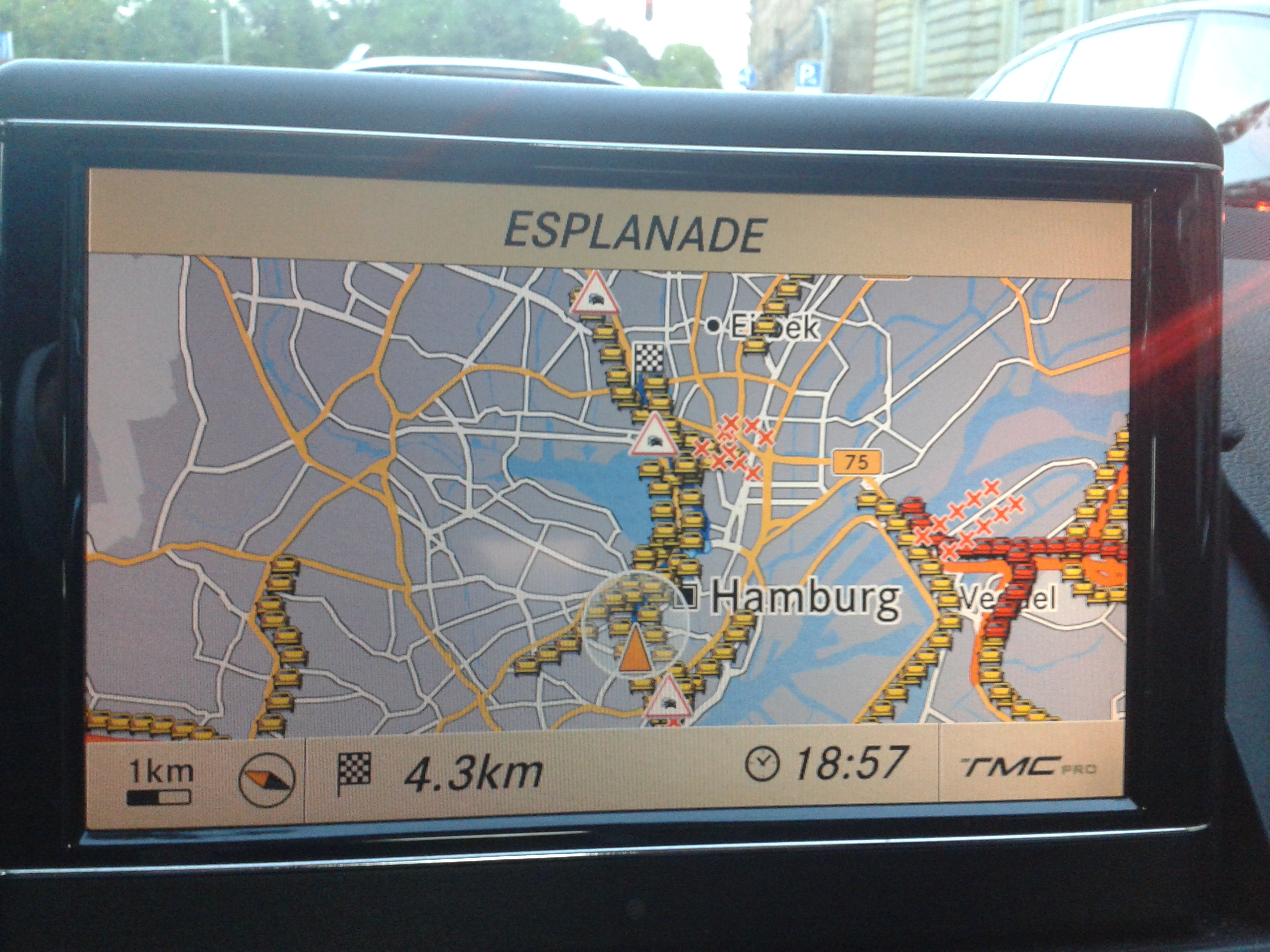
Command APS in a C200 2011 model

Somewhat confusingly, COMAND-APS NTG2.5 was introduced after NTG4, replacing COMAND in models previously fitted with NTG1 and NTG2 systems (apart from the W209 CLK as that model was replaced by the W207 E-Class coupe. The unit has a SD card reader in addition to the DVD drive. An optional DVD changer can replace the single drive. The Mercedes-Benz option code is 512 for the single drive unit and 527 for the unit with the optional DVD changer. Like NTG4 models, it supports the Media Interface. The unit also stores the navigation maps on an internal HDD which have some extra space for mp3 files.

=== COMAND-APS NTG4.5 ===
In late 2011, Mercedes starting fitting the new COMAND-APS NTG4.5 to its W204 cars for Model Year 2012, and then to other models such as the W212, W207 and R172 SLK. It thus became the latest generation of COMAND for its non-flagship cars (i.e. cars other than the S-Class and CL-Class). It is also referred to as COMAND Online as it can use the mobile broadband connection on the telephone to connect to Mercedes-Benz Internet based services. It allows the running of various downloadable apps (such as Facebook) in the COMAND system. It uses a 7" colour display and has a SD-Card slot. The resolution is 800*480 pixels.

Initially, the graphics were brown and black, and this system became known as GEN1. The colour scheme of the display were then changed to Grey/Black/Red at the same time as the graphics in the instrument cluster changed and this is known as GEN2 and coincided with the MY2013 update. Initially different firmware was used in GEN1 and GEN2, but later on the firmware for GEN1 and GEN2 was merged into 1 firmware release and the colour scheme became a run-time configuration item.

Again, Media Interface is supported and maps are stored on a hard disk and restricted, as with NTG3.5, by a PIN based rights management protection feature. Like NTG3/3.5 it also has a separate rotary controller (although smaller than for NTG3/3.5 based vehicles).

=== COMAND-APS NTG4.7 ===
COMAND-4.7 was installed in vehicles from June 2013 onwards, such as GLK350(2015). It now supports direct tethering of iPhones & Android phones for internet functions which was not previously possible with these devices. It also features internet radio plus slight changes to the route guidance.

The differences to NTG4.5 are new Mercedes Apps; a CPU upgrade; increase from 80G to 100G SATA; better Navigator figure performance. This enabled a more fluent system.

Supported file formats are:

- Audio
  - MP3 (supported bit rates: fixed and variable 32 kbit/s to 320 kbit/s, sampling rates of 8 kHz to 48 kHz)
  - WMA (fixed 5 kbit/s to 384 kbit/s, sampling rates of 8 kHz to 48 kHz)
  - CD-A
  - AAC (Apple formats): .aac, .mp4, .m4a, and .m4b (copy protected files are not supported)
- Video
  - MPEG
  - WMV
  - M4V
  - AVI

=== COMAND-APS NTG5.0 ===
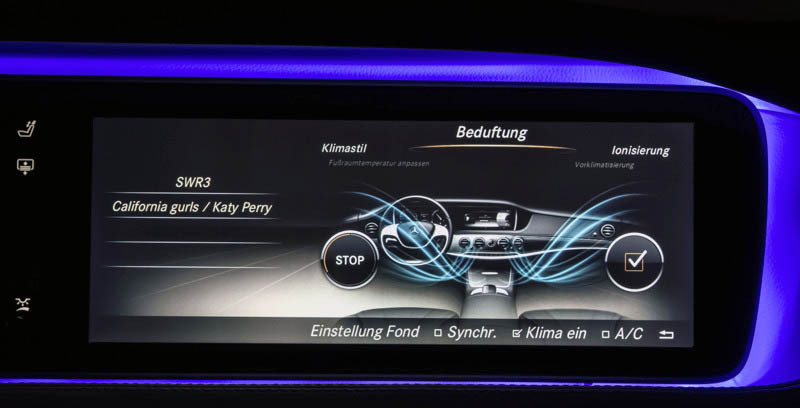
Mercedes-Benz S-Class (W222) COMAND Online NTG5.0

This is the last version to use the COMAND name and was introduced in the 2013/2014 S class, the 2014 GLA and the C-class. It includes Mercedes Online Radio which is broadcast from Europe 24/7. The maps zoom in/out more smoothly and are enriched with graphics and functions. The core of the system is an Intel Atom processor.

There are three generations of NTG5, NTG5*1, NTG5*2 and NTG5.5. NTG5*1 has a keypad, whereas NTG5*2 / NTG5.5 does not. COMAND NTG5*1 has support for Apple CarPlay and Android Auto NTG5*2 is fitted in S, CL, C, GLC, AMG-GTS, X-Class and the new generation Vito. NTG5*1 is fitted to facelift A, B, CLA, GLA, W207-E, W212-E, CLS, GLE and GLS vehicles. NTG5*5 was fitted to the new W213-E class and is replacing NTG5*2 as vehicles are face-lifted.

The NTG 5.0 plays the following file formats:

Audio:

- MP3 v1, 128 kbit/s, 44.1 kHz, Stereo (.mp3)
- MP3 v1, 320 kbit/s, 44.1 kHz, Stereo (.mp3)
- ISO Media, MPEG v4 system, iTunes AAC-LC (.m4a)
- PCM, 16 bit, stereo 44100 Hz (.wav)

Video:

- MPEG sequence, v1, system multiplex (DVD PAL, MPEG2) (.mpg)
- MPEG-4 AVC H264, AAC Audio (.mkv)
- ISO Media, MPEG v4 system, version 1 (.mp4)

=== Mercedes-Benz User Experience (MBUX) ===
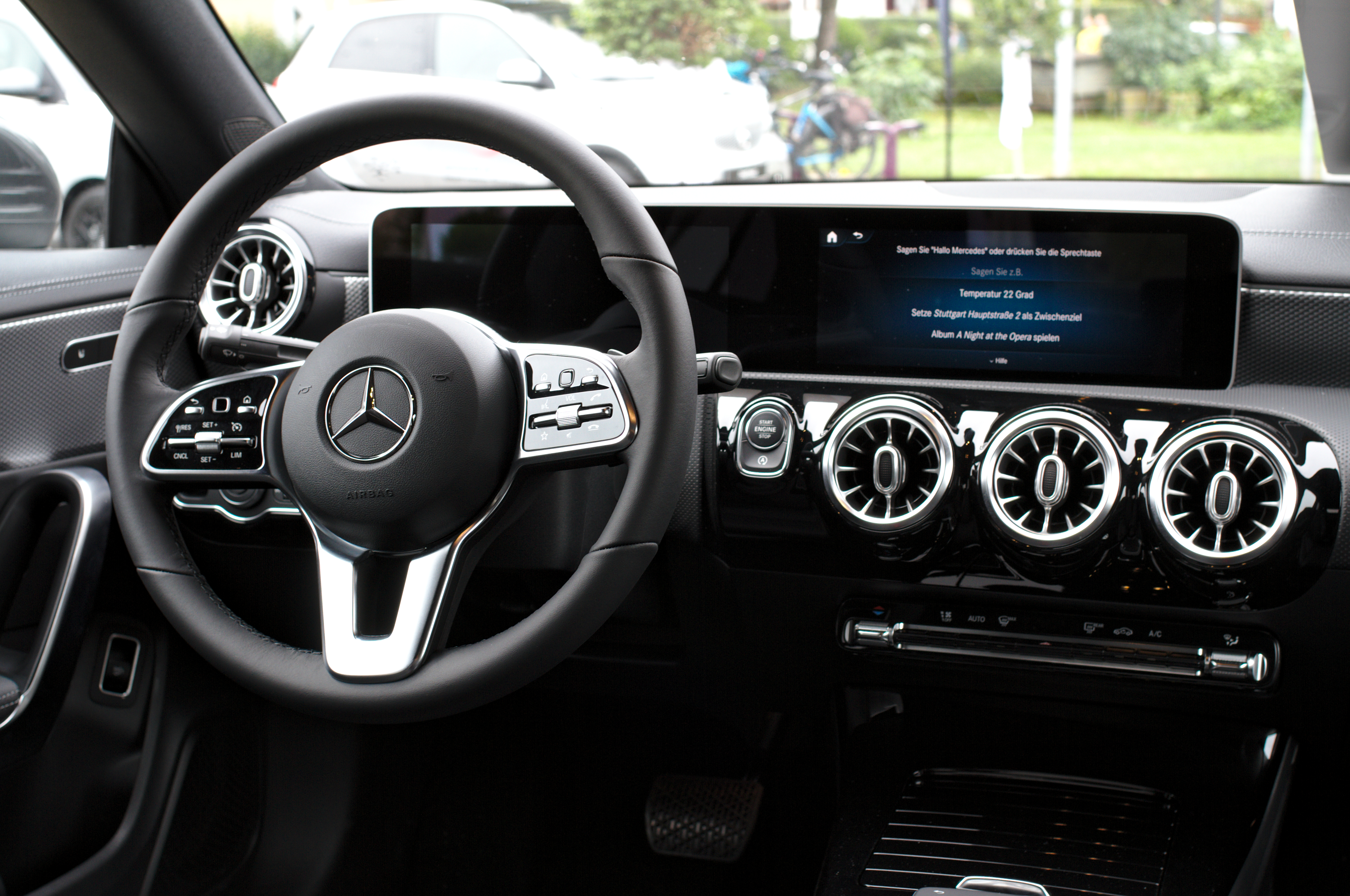
MBUX in a Mercedes-Benz CLA

The COMAND name is no longer in use and has been replaced by MBUX in many Mercedes-Benz vehicles. A second-generation system, called "My MBUX", is being introduced to the new W223 series S-Class.

==== Marketing ====
OMD produced a mobile phone commercial for the MBUX feature.
