= EcoSCART =

Technology for television sets

EcoSCART is a technology available for audio-video equipment which is connected to a television set by an SCART cable.

A device that embeds the ecoSCART function goes to standby or wakes up automatically, per the status of the TV. The first device in which ecoSCART was implemented was the Zapbox EH-M2 digital TV converter box.

EcoSCART's saves energy by preventing a television from operating while turned off; and to lessen its use by automatically putting the TV in external mode.
