= SCART =

21-pin connector for audio-visual equipment

EuroSCART (Syndicat des Constructeurs d'Appareils Radiorécepteurs et Téléviseurs) Péritel
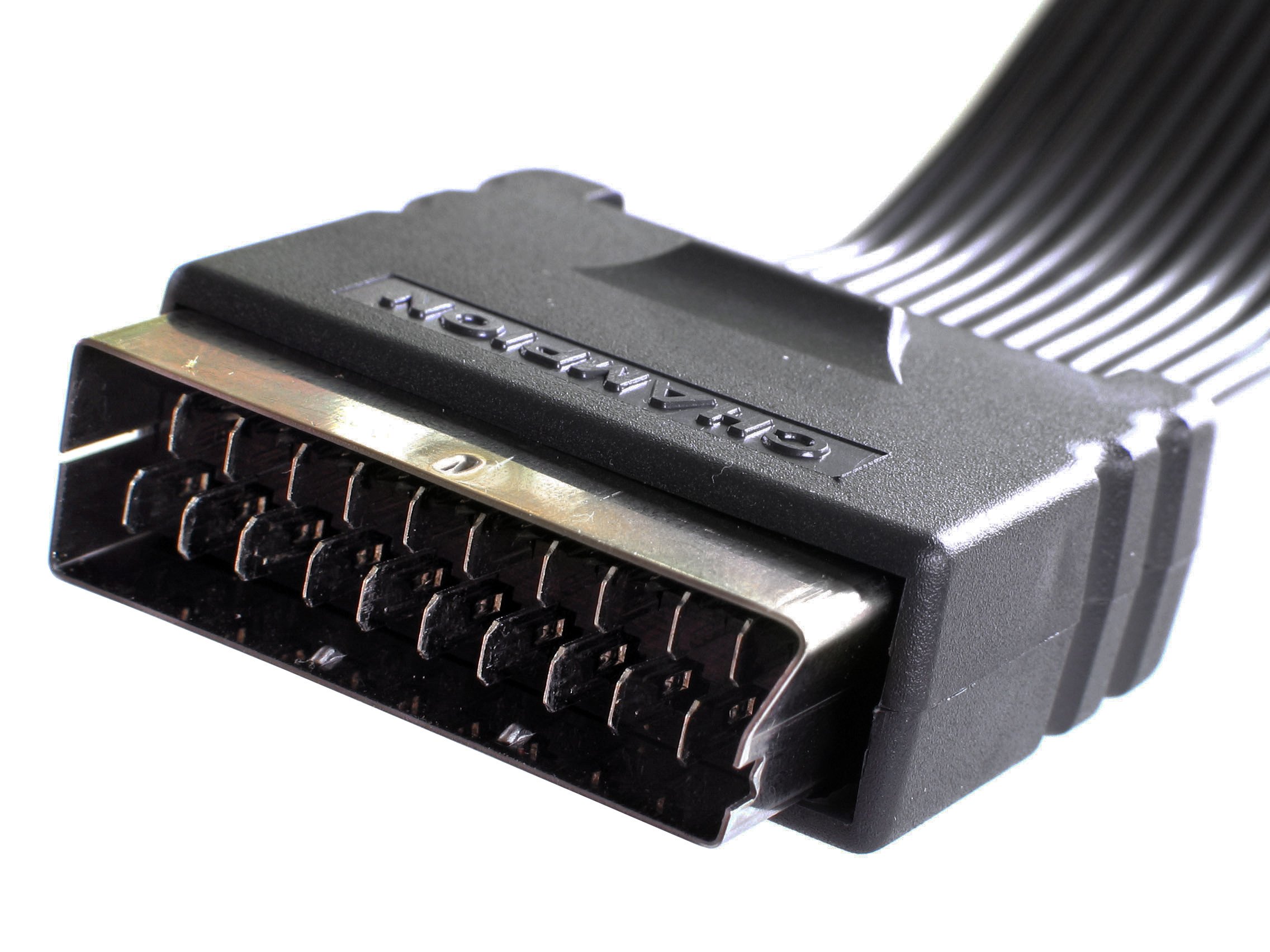
- A male SCART connector (21-pin)
- Type: Analogue audio and video connector

Production history
- Designer: CENELEC
- Designed: 1976; 50 years ago
- Superseded: RCA, DIN (in Europe)
- Superseded by: HDMI, DisplayPort

General specifications
- Audio signal: Bi-directional Stereo
- Video signal: Composite (bi-directional), RGB (uni-directional), S-Video (sometimes bi-directional), or YPbPr (Component)
- Pins: 21 (21 wires:RGB/10 wires:CVBS); 10 (10 wires:CVBS)

Data
- Data signal: D²B and widescreen switching

Pinout
- Female connector seen from the front
Pin 1		Audio output (right)
Pin 2		Audio input (right)
Pin 3		Audio output (left/mono)
Pin 4		Audio ground (pins 1, 2, 3 & 6 ground)
Pin 5		RGB Blue ground (pin 7 ground)
Pin 6		Audio input (left/mono)
Pin 7		RGB Blue up S-Video C down^{[a]} Component P_{B} up^{[b]}
Pin 8		Status & Aspect Ratio up^{[c]}: 0–2 V → off; +5–8 V → on/16:9; +9.5–12 V → on/4:3
Pin 9		RGB Green ground (pin 11 ground)
Pin 10		Clock / Data 2^{[d]} Control bus (AV.link)
Pin 11		RGB Green up Component Y up^{[b]}
Pin 12		Reserved / Data 1^{[d]}
Pin 13		RGB Red ground (pin 15 ground)
Pin 14		Usually Data signal ground (pins 8, 10 & 12 ground)
Pin 15		RGB Red up S-Video C up Component P_{R} up^{[b]}
Pin 16		Blanking signal up RGB-selection voltage up: 0–0.4 V → composite; 1–3 V → RGB
Pin 17		Composite video ground (pin 19 & 20 ground)
Pin 18		Blanking signal ground (pin 16 ground)
Pin 19		Composite video output S-Video Y output
Pin 20		Composite video input S-Video Y input
Pin 21		Shell/Chassis^{[e]}
- output/input denotes symmetrical links up/down denotes links to/from the TV set a rarely supported. b non-standard extension. c from STB to VCR when used for unattended recording; 12V forces tv-set to AV-channel d protocol not standardised, e.g. D²B. e This pin is part of the shell/surround of the male connector. It is often connected to the overall screen in a cheap cable. In equipment, Pin 21 should be connected separately to the chassis, but often it is merely connected to all the other ground pins.

SCART (also known as Péritel or Péritélévision, especially in France, 21-pin EuroSCART in marketing by Sharp in Asia, Euroconector in Spain, EuroAV or EXT, or EIA Multiport in the United States, as an EIA interface) is a French-originated standard and associated 21-pin connector for connecting audio-visual (AV) equipment. The name SCART comes from Syndicat des Constructeurs d'Appareils Radiorécepteurs et Téléviseurs, "Radio and Television Receiver Manufacturers' Association", the French organisation that created the connector in the mid-1970s. The related European standard EN 50049 was refined and published in 1978 by CENELEC, calling it péritélévision, but it is commonly called by the abbreviation péritel in French.

The signals carried by SCART include both composite and RGB (with composite synchronisation) video, stereo audio input/output and digital signalling. SCART is also capable of carrying S-Video signals, using the red pins for chroma. A TV can be woken from standby mode and automatically switch to the appropriate AV channel when the SCART attached device is switched on. SCART was also used for high definition signals such as 720p, 1080i, 1080p with YPbPr connection by some manufacturers, but this usage is scarce due to the advent of HDMI.

In Europe, SCART was the most common method of connecting AV equipment and was a standard connector for such devices; it was far less common elsewhere.

The official standard for SCART is CENELEC document number EN 50049–1. SCART is sometimes referred to as the IEC 933-1 standard.

== History ==
Before SCART was introduced, TVs did not offer a standardised way of inputting signals other than RF antenna connectors, and these differed between countries. Assuming other connectors even existed, devices made by various companies could have different and incompatible standards. For example, a domestic VCR could output a composite video signal through a German-originated DIN-style connector, an American-originated RCA connector, an SO239 connector or a BNC connector.

The SCART connector first appeared on TVs in 1977. It became compulsory on new TVs sold in France from January 1980, and since 1987 in eastern Europe, such as Poland. The actual French legal decree was adopted on 7 February 1980 and revoked on 3 July 2015.

The standard was subject to several amendments and at least 2 major revisions, approved by CENELEC on 13 November 1988 (EN 50049-1:1989) and 1 July 1997 (EN 50049-1:1997).

== Features ==
The SCART system was intended to simplify connecting AV equipment (including TVs, VCRs, DVD players, and games consoles). To achieve this it gathered all of the analogue signal connections into a single cable with a unique connector, which normally made incorrect connections nearly impossible.

The signals carried by SCART include both composite and RGB (with composite synchronisation) video, stereo audio input/output and digital signalling. The standard was extended at the end of the 1980s to support the new S-Video signals. A TV can be awakened from standby mode, and it can automatically switch to appropriate AV channel, when the device attached to it through a SCART connector is turned on.

=== Daisy chaining ===
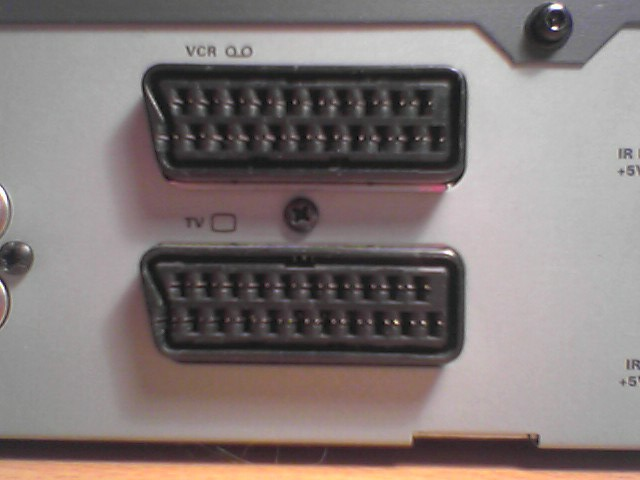
Typical SCART sockets on a set-top box

SCART is bi-directional regarding standard composite video and analogue audio. A TV will typically send the antenna audio and video signals to the SCART sockets all the time and watch for returned signals, to display and reproduce them. This allows "transparent" set-top boxes, without any tuner, which just "hook" and pre-process the TV signals. This feature is used for analogue pay TV like Canal Plus and was used for decoding teletext.

A VCR will often have two SCART sockets, to connect it to the TV ("up", "primary" or "1"), and for video input from a set-top box or other device ("down", "secondary" or "2"). When idle or powered off, VCRs will usually forward the signals from the TV to the set-top decoder and send the processed result back to the TV. When a scrambled show is recorded, the VCR will drive the set-top box from its own tuner and send the unscrambled signals to the TV for viewing or simple recording control. Alternatively, the VCR could use the signals from the TV, in which case it would be inadvisable to change channels on the TV during the recording.

The "down" socket can also be used to connect other devices, such as DVD players or game consoles. As long as all devices have at least one "down" and "up" socket, this allows for connecting a virtually unlimited number of devices to a single SCART socket on the TV. While audio and video signals can travel both "up" to the TV and "down" to devices farther away from the TV, this is not true for RGB (and non-standard YP_{B}P_{R}) signals, which can only travel towards the TV.

"Down" and "up" are conventional. Logically, the TV is the last device of the "up" chain-path (stream) and the first device in the "down" chain path. Physically, the TV is under the device which sits on its top, hence the name "set-top box" for the device. Moreover, some sockets' relative position may enforce the belief that the TV is physically the last in the down direction.

Logically, the TV is on top and ends the "up" chain-path, translating the electrical info into an image and sound. From the same logical point of view the info stream, wherever it originates, may need processing such as decrypting (decoding, descrambling) or adding captioning/subtitles. In this case the info stream is sent logically "down" to dedicated function devices. From the last processing device the info stream is sent logically "up" to the TV, through all the chain-path. Another case is when the info stream is sent "down" and not expected to be sent back "up", for example when sent to a recorder.

Closing a loop on either the "up" or "down" chain-path may not have useful effects and may create instability.

=== Direct connections ===
As audio and (composite) video use the same pins on "down" and "up" connectors (and require a crosslinked cable), it is also possible to connect two devices directly to each other without paying attention to the type of the socket.

However, this no longer works when S-Video signals are used. As straight links (RGB red and blue up) were re-purposed to carry chrominance information, the S-Video pinouts are different for "down" and "up" SCART connectors. Further, they are often not fully implemented.

Paying attention to the type of socket is essential when handling component RGB/YP_{B}P_{R}/S-video. Damage can be caused to devices incorrectly connected as follows:

- connecting SCART 1 ("up") from one device to SCART 1 ("up") of another device when both SCARTs are configured for RGB/YP_{B}P_{R}/S-video-up. Pins 7, 11 and 15 are outputs.
- connecting SCART 2 ("down") from one device to SCART 2 ("down") of another device when both SCARTs are configured for S-video-down. Pin 7 is an output.
- connecting SCART 1 ("up") from a device configured RGB/YP_{B}P_{R}, to SCART 2 ("down") of another device configured with S-video-down. Pin 7 is an output.

Damaging pins 7, 11 or 15 may result in yellow, purple or blue/green images, due to the missing blue, green or red components respectively. When using S-video, damaging pin 7 or 15 may result in black-white images due to the missing chroma component ("down" and "up" respectively). Similarly, damaging pins 7 and 15 (P_{B} and P_{R}) while leaving pin 11 (Y) undamaged may result in black-white images when using YP_{B}P_{R}. Damaging more than one of these pins may result in combined effects.

=== RGB overlays ===
SCART enables a device to command the TV to very quickly switch between signals, in order to create overlays in the image. In order to implement captioning or subtitles, a SCART set-top box does not have to process and send back a complete new video signal, which would require full decoding and re-encoding of the color information, a signal-degrading and costly process, especially given the presence of different standards in Europe. The box can instead ask the TV to stop displaying the normal signal and display a signal it generates internally for selected image areas, with pixel-level granularity. This can also be driven by the use of a "transparent" color in a teletext page.

=== Device control ===
SCART allows a connected device to bring it in and out of standby mode or to switch it to the AV channel. A VCR or other playback device will optimally power on when a cassette is inserted, power on the TV (or switch it to video mode) and then start playing immediately if the cassette write protection tab is absent. When turned off, the VCR will ask the TV to power off, which it will do if it had been powered on by the VCR's request and if it remained in video mode. Only some TVs will do this—most only implement automatic switching to and from the SCART input.

The same signal can be used by a satellite receiver or set-top box to signal a VCR that it is supposed to start and stop recording ("pin 8 recording"). This configuration usually requires that the VCR be farther from the TV than the source, so the signal usually travels "down".

== Design ==
=== Cables ===
The cables for connecting equipment together have a male plug at each end. Some of the wires such as ground, data, switching and RGB connect to the identical pin number at each end. Others such as audio and video are swapped so that an output signal at one end of the cable connects to an input signal at the other end. The complete list of wires that are swapped are: pins 1 and 2, pins 3 and 6, pins 17 and 18, pins 19 and 20.

The original SCART specification provided for different cable (cordset) types denoted by a key color, but color-coding is rarely used and cables often use different, non-standard configurations.

Type		Ring color	Pins	Description	Symmetric
U	Universal	black	1–20, 21	Fully wired cable.	no
V	Video only	white	17–20, 21	Only composite wires.	yes
C	Combined	grey	1–4, 6, 17–20, 21	Composite Video and Audio	yes
A	Audio only	yellow	1–4, 6, 21	Audio	yes
B	Bus	green	10, 12, 21	Only data connections	Depends on protocol used

Maximum SCART cable length is estimated to be about 10 to 15 metres without amplification.

Due to the relatively high signal voltages used in SCART, "hot plugging" (connecting or disconnecting devices while they are on) is not recommended. Although there is no risk of personal injury, there is the possibility of damaging electronics within the devices if the connector is inserted improperly. Also, since many TVs are Class II (double-insulated) rather than earthed, the large exposed shield on the SCART connector will be held at approximately half mains voltage if it is plugged into a powered TV with the other end unplugged. If the cable is then plugged into an earthed device with a metal case, inadvertent contact with the SCART cable shield while the earthed device is touched with the other hand can cause a painful electric shock. For this reason the device end of the cable should always be plugged in first and the TV end plugged in last.

Quality differences exist in SCART cables. While a proper SCART cable uses miniature coaxial cables for the video signals, cheap SCART cables often use plain wires for all signals, resulting in a loss of image quality and greatly reducing the maximum cable length. A common problem on a cheap SCART cable is that a TV outputs a composite video signal from its internal tuner and this is induced or crosstalked onto an incoming video signal due to inadequate or non-existent screening; the result is ghostly images or shimmering superimposed on the incoming signal. To non-destructively verify if a SCART cable uses coaxial cables, unscrew the strain relief at the SCART connector and fold open the plastic shell.

Using higher-quality cables such as those with ribbon cords that have properly shielded coaxial cables inside might help in reducing a 'ghosting' effect, but it does not always eliminate it due to various factors. A more permanent method is to remove pin 19 (Video Out) from the SCART plug that is put into the TV, preventing a signal from being broadcast by the TV into the cable, so it cannot cross-talk with the incoming signal.

=== Blanking and switching ===
Two pins provide switching signals.

Pin 8, the switch signal pin, carries a DC voltage from the source that indicates the type of video present.

- 0 V–2 V means no signal, or internal bypass
- 4.5 V–7 V (nominal 6 V) means a widescreen (16:9) signal
- 9.5 V–12 V (nominal 12 V) means a normal (4:3) signal

Pin 16, the blanking signal pin, carries a signal from the source that indicates that the signal is either RGB or composite.

- 0 V–0.4 V means composite.
- 1 V–3 V (nominal 1 V) means RGB only.

The original specification defined pin 16 as a high frequency (up to 3 MHz) signal that blanked the composite video. The RGB inputs were always active and the signal 'punches holes' in the composite video. This could be used to overlay subtitles from an external Teletext decoder.

- 0 V–0.4 V means composite with a transparent RGB overlay.
- 1 V–3 V (nominal 1 V) RGB only.

There is no switching signal to indicate S-Video. Some TVs can auto-detect the presence of the S-Video signal but more commonly the S-Video input needs to be manually selected. The same for the rare component YPbPr, which is in many cases implemented over a composite or RGB SCART.

=== Non-standard extensions ===
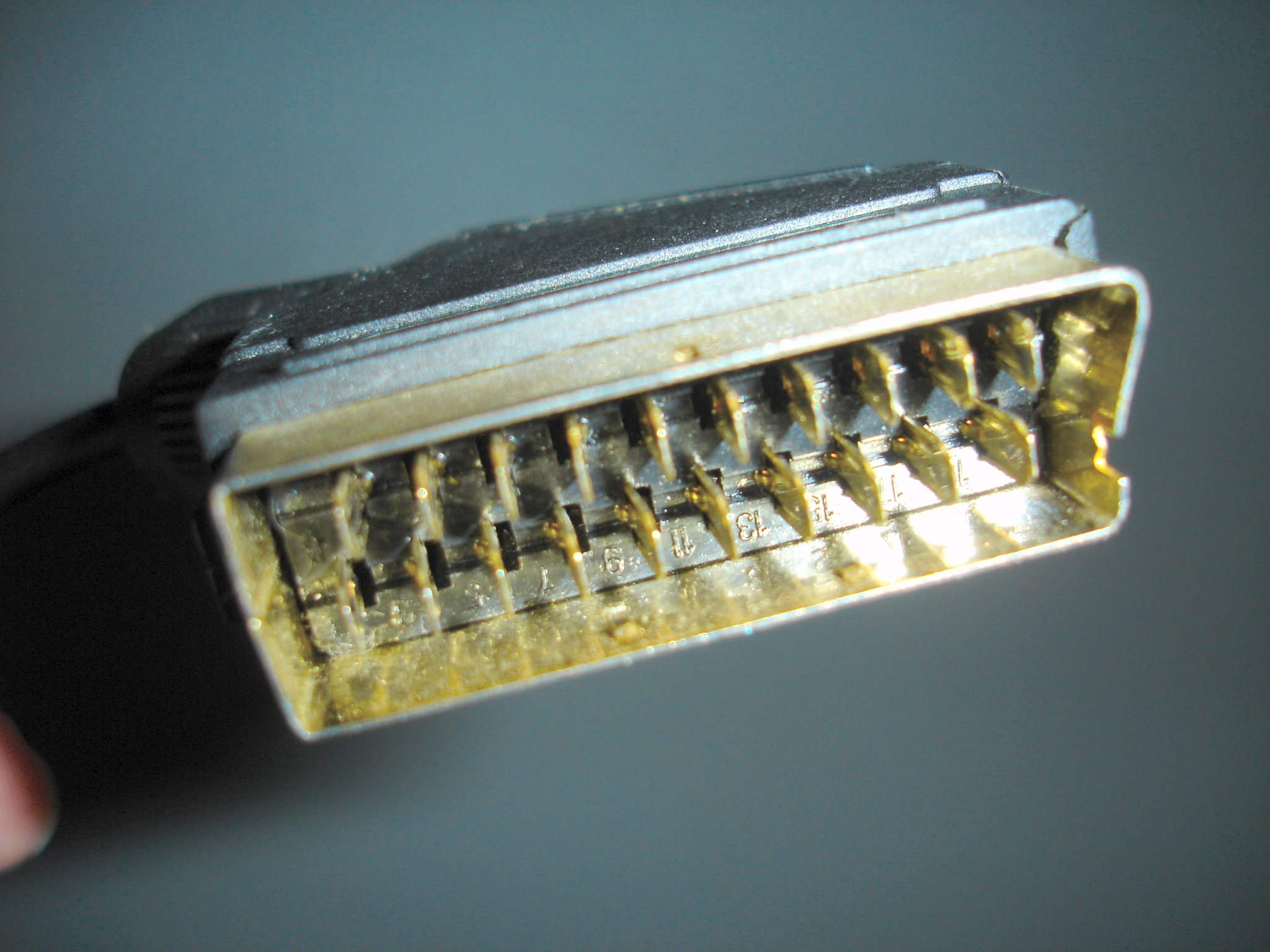
RGB-capable SCART (gold plated)

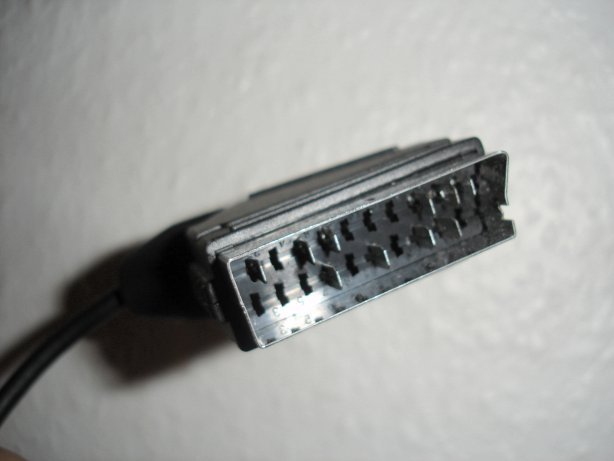
Non-RGB SCART male connector. Only 10 pins (2, 6, 7, 8, 11, 15, 16, 17, 18, 20) are available. Some cheap cables or devices (DVD players, TVs) have a 21-pin SCART connector or socket that actually have 10 wires connected and are thus not RGB / S-Video capable, but only CVBS.

The use of the data pins was not standardised in the original SCART specification, resulting in the use of several different protocols, both proprietary protocols and semi-proprietary protocols based on standards such as D²B.

Some of the most creative usages appeared in analogue satellite receivers. The function of decoding hybrid, time-compressed analogue-digital MAC transmissions into RGB and analogue audio was akin to making a digital receiver out of an analogue one. The D²B pins (10 and 12) were used for communicating with satellite dish positioners and for driving magnetic polarisers, before these became incorporated into LNBs. The daisy-chaining features were used to connect both a Pay TV decoder and a dish positioner/polariser to a single Decoder socket on the receiver.

CENELEC EN 50157-1 introduced AV.link as a standardised protocol to carry advanced control information between devices. It is a single-wire serial data bus and allows carrying remote control information and to negotiate analogue signal types (e.g. RGB). AV.link is also known as nexTViewLink or trade names such as SmartLink, Q-Link or EasyLink. It appears as the Consumer Electronics Control channel in HDMI.

The data pins, 10, 12, 14, were used by some manufacturers for Dolby Pro Logic, surround and multichannel on their TV sets (some high end models with built in Dolby decoders, and external surround speakers, both CRT, LCD and plasma sets, and only in Europe – and European versions of Japanese TV Sets and DVD players – and mainly on S/PDIF), in order to connect a DVD player to the TV set and stream the Dolby and DTS to the surround of the TV set. However, this protocol was rarely used, as it was limited only to a certain manufacturer, and the connections were different from a manufacturer to another, and in some cases, it was only commanded by the pin 8. In this case, it was unusable with RCA to SCART adapters. Also, if a Compatible TV with such connection and a compatible DVD with such connection, but from different manufacturers were interconnected, the surround might not work, and only the stereo sound from the DVD player was available to the TV, because some manufacturers did not use SPDIF, but an own protocol. Also, this connection might be also lost, if the connection of the DVD with the TV was made indirectly (through a VCR in daisy chaining mode, for example), however, some VCR allowed the pass-through of these signals. Some DVD player manufacturers on some models offered SPDIF only on SCART, and an adapter in order to extract the digital audio signal to send it to a home cinema. To the present day this connection remains rare, as HDMI, S/PDIF, and TOSLINK can provide multichannel audio, also some TV sets with Surround built in may have an Optical or S/PDIF INPUT, beside Output.

== Implementations ==
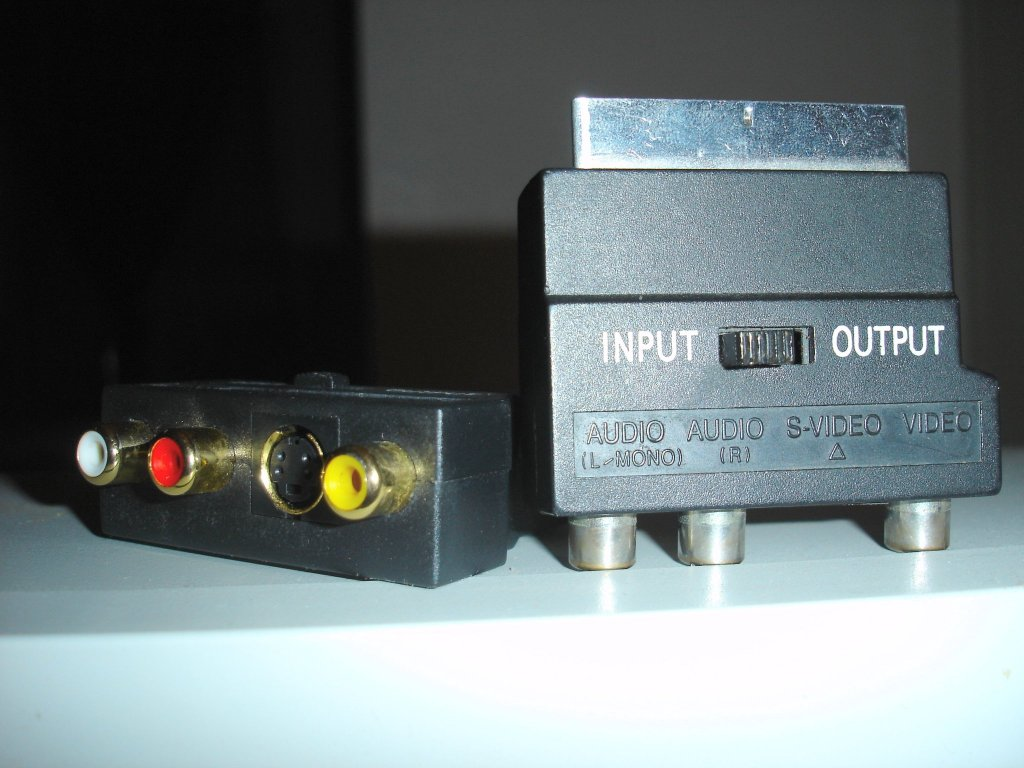
Multi-AV (2-channel audio, S-Video and CVBS) SCART adaptors with input/output signal switch

Nearly all modern DVD players and set-top boxes with SCART sockets can output RGB signal, which offers superior picture quality to composite signal. However, many devices do not have RGB output turned on by default, instead defaulting to composite video: RGB often has to be set up manually in the menu or via switches on the back of the device.

The GameCube, Wii, Neo-Geo, Dreamcast, PlayStation, PlayStation 2, PlayStation 3, Xbox and Xbox 360 can output RGB, component video, S-Video, or composite video. These consoles come with the standard composite video connector, but the manufacturers and third parties sell connectors for component video hookup and for RGB SCART hookup. Where the Nintendo GameCube and Xbox automatically switch to the proper mode, the PlayStation 2 must be told via a selection in the system menu whether it is to use YP_{B}P_{R} or RGB video. RGB is only available on PAL region GameCube and Wii consoles, while S-Video is only available on NTSC consoles.

Some older consoles such as the Master System, Mega Drive/Genesis, and Super Nintendo Entertainment System output RGB, and many older home computers (Amstrad CPC, later ZX Spectrum models, MSX, Amiga, Atari ST, BBC Micro and Acorn Archimedes, etc.) output RGB with composite sync suitable for SCART use, via DIN plugs. Standard-resolution arcade monitors use RGB signals with a composite sync, which is SCART-compatible.

Besides simple connection of external devices to SCART TVs, RGB SCART is used in the retrogaming scene for connecting vintage games consoles (including ones internally modified for RGB or 60 Hz RGB where necessary) to:

- RGB SCART inputs of upscalers / analogue-to-digital converters; these output over HDMI at higher than original resolution, to modern TVs / monitors / projectors / capture cards, or, via further conversion (HDMI to VGA digital-to-analogue) CRT PC monitors
- RGB SCART to RGB BNC adapters and into RGB CRT professional video monitors
- RGB SCART to S-video converters, for achieving the best video quality on a combination of a TV / monitor with S-video as its best input but with a console that cannot output S-video, but can output RGB as its best output

The SAM Coupé microcomputer also uses a SCART connector for its output, however it is a non-standard pinout.

== Japanese RGB 21-pin connector ==
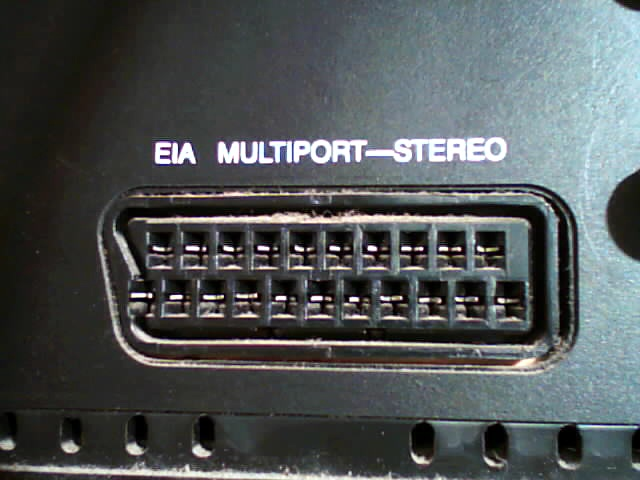
EIA interface on a 1987 RCA Dimensia

Alternative Japanese JP21 pinout

There is also a Japanese version of the SCART connector, which is referred to as the Japanese RGB-21 connector, EIAJ TTC-003, or simply JP-21. This version of SCART uses similar signals and the same connector, but it has a different pinout. In Japan and Korea, it is commonly called RGB-21 while it is more generally called JP-21 in the English-speaking world.

JP-21 was standardised in January 1983 with the norm TTC-0003 published by EIAJ, which was superseded in March 1993 by the norm CPR-1201 to include S-Video. CPR-1201 was withdrawn in March 2003 to be replaced by the equivalent norm CPR-1205, representing Japan's transition from analogue to digital, and thus antiquating analogue connectors.

It was adopted in Japan for the connector's ability to support RGB output format (no compression nor deterioration of original video signals) but, contrary to SCART in Europe, it never saw widespread use on the consumer market.

When using RGB video, the red channel uses the same pins in both standards, so red video with no audio is indicative of mismatching JP-21 SCART with EuroSCART.

JP21 pinout
Pin	Function	Pin	Function
1	Audio left channel input	2	Audio left channel output
3	Audio ground	4	Audio ground
5	Audio right channel input	6	Audio right channel output
7	Video ground	8	Video ground
9	CVBS input	10	CVBS output
11	AV control input	12	Ym input
13	Red signal ground	14	Ground
15	Red signal I/O	16	Ys input
17	Green signal ground	18	Blue signal ground
19	Green signal I/O	20	Blue signal I/O
21	Plug shield		

Notes:

- Audio input: 0.40 mVrms, > 47K ohms
- Audio output: 0.40 mVrms, > 10K ohms
- CVBS (composite video) in and out: 1 Vp-p, 75 ohms, sync: negative
- Ym input: Switches RGB to half-brightness, for video overlay (L: < 0.4 V, H: > 1 V, 75 ohms)
- Ys input: RGB in/out: (ground for output, 1 V+ for input (preferred))
- All RGB lines: 0.7 Vp-p, 75 ohms

== Newer standards ==
As it was designed to carry analogue standard-definition content, SCART is rarely used since the adoption of HDMI, which carry high-definition content and multichannel audio.

== See also ==
- D-Terminal
- EcoSCART
- List of display interfaces
- RF connector
