= Multi-master bus =

A multi-master bus is a computer bus in which there are multiple bus master nodes present on the bus. This is used when multiple nodes on the bus must initiate transfer. For example, direct memory access (DMA) is used to transfer data between peripherals and memory without the need to use the central processing unit (CPU).

Some buses like I²C use multi-mastering inherently to allow any node to initiate a transfer with another node.
