= IEC 61030 =

Electronics technical standard

D²B (Domestic Digital Bus, IEC 61030) is an IEC standard for a low-speed multi-master serial communication bus for home automation applications. It was originally developed by Philips in the 1980s. In 2006 it has been withdrawn by IEC because another standard was proposed, JTC1 SC 83/WG1. There remain many IEC61030-compliant devices, such as some Philips-branded head units and CD changers from car stereos.

The SCART connector provides a D²B connection for inter-device communication.

== See also ==
- I²C
- ISO/IEC JTC 1
