= Domestic Digital Bus (automotive) =

Domestic Digital Bus, D2B, is an isochronous ring-based fibre-optic communications technology, with a bandwidth of 12 Mbit/s, specified by the Optical Chip Consortium for use in automotive applications. D2B was previously used by Mercedes-Benz in some of their models, before being replaced by MOST.
