= Lag (video games) =

Delay on computers

In computers, lag is delay (latency) between the action of the user (input) and the reaction of the server supporting the task, which has to be sent back to the client.

The player's ability to tolerate lag depends on the type of game being played. For instance, a strategy game or a turn-based game with a slow pace may have a high threshold or even be mostly unaffected by high lag. A game with twitch gameplay such as a first-person shooter or a fighting game with a considerably faster pace may require a significantly lower lag to provide satisfying gameplay.

Lag is mostly measured in milliseconds (ms) and may be displayed in-game (sometimes called a lagometer). The most common causes of lag are expressed as ping time (or simply ping) and the frame rate (fps). Generally a lag below 100 ms (10 hz or fps) is considered to be necessary for playability. The lowest ping physically possible for a connection between opposite points on Earth crossing half of the planet is 133 ms. Other causes of lag result commonly in a lag below a playable 20 ms (50 Hz or fps), or in the loss, corruption or jitter of the game.

== Causes ==
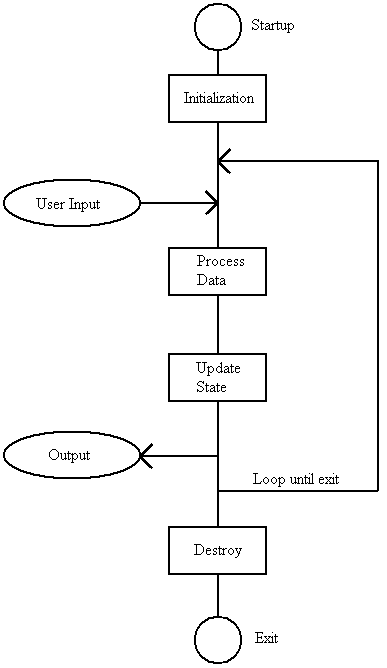
A simplified game architecture

While a single-player game maintains the main game state on the local machine, an online game requires it to be maintained on a central server in order to avoid inconsistencies between individual clients. As such, the client has no direct control over the central game state and may only send change requests to the server, and can only update the local game state by receiving updates from the server. This need to communicate causes a delay between the clients and the server, and is the fundamental cause behind lag. While there may be numerous underlying reasons for why a player experiences lag, most common reasons are poor connection between the client and server, or insufficient processing in either the client or the server.

=== Connection ===
Perhaps the most common type of lag is caused by network performance problems. Losses, corruption or jitter (an outdated packet is in effect a loss) may all cause problems, but these problems are relatively rare in a network with sufficient bandwidth and no or little congestion. Instead, the latency involved in transmitting data between clients and server plays a significant role. Latency varies depending on a number of factors, such as the physical distance between the end-systems, as a longer distance means additional transmission length and routing required and therefore higher latency. Routing over the Internet may be extremely indirect, resulting in far more transmission length (and consequent latency) than a direct route, although the cloud gaming service OnLive has developed a solution to this issue by establishing peering relationships with multiple Tier 1 network Internet Service Providers and choosing an optimal route between server and user.

==== Ping time ====
Ping time, or simply ping, is the main measure of connection lag. Ping time is the network delay for a round trip between a player's client and the game server as measured with the ping utility or equivalent. Ping time is an average time measured in milliseconds (ms). The lower one's ping is, the lower the latency is and the less lag the player will experience. High ping and low ping are commonly used terms in online gaming, where high ping refers to a ping that causes a severe amount of lag; while any level of ping may cause lag, severe lag is usually indicated by a ping of over 100 ms. This usage is a gaming cultural colloquialism and is not commonly found or used in professional computer networking circles.

Some factors that might particularly affect ping include: communication protocol used, Internet throughput (connection speed), the quality of a user's Internet service provider and the configuration of firewalls. Ping is also affected by geographical location. For instance, if someone is in India, playing on a server located in the United States, the distance between the two is greater than it would be for players located within the US, and therefore it takes longer for data to be transmitted, resulting at 20,000 km (halfway around the Earth) in a ping of 133 ms. However, the amount of packet-switching and network hardware in between the two computers is often more significant. For instance, wireless network interface cards must modulate digital signals into radio signals, which is often more costly than the time it takes an electrical signal to traverse a typical span of cable. As such, lower ping can result in faster Internet download and upload rates.

=== Interface ===
==== Input-lag ====
Input-lag or input latency is the lag produced by the input device, such as a mouse, keyboard or other controller, and its connection. Wireless devices are particularly affected by this kind of lag. Some people claim to notice extra lag when using a wireless controller, while other people claim that the 4–8 milliseconds of lag is negligible. The refresh rate is a type or part of input-lag that is the rate of a display to produce distinct picture, measured in Hz (e.g. 60, 240 or 360, that is 16.7, 4.2 or 2.7 ms respectively).

==== Display lag ====
This is the lag caused by the television or monitor (also called output lag). In addition to the latency imposed by the screen's pixel response time, any image processing (such as upscaling, motion smoothing, or edge smoothing) takes time and therefore adds more input lag. An input lag below 30 ms is generally considered unnoticeable in a television. Once the frame has been processed, the final step is the updating the pixels to display the correct color for the new frame. The time this takes is called the pixel response time.

== Effects ==
The noticeable effects of lag vary not only depending on the exact cause, but also on all techniques for lag compensation that the game may implement (described below). As all clients experience some delay, implementing these methods to minimize the effect on players is important for smooth gameplay. Lag causes numerous problems for issues such as accurate rendering of the game state and hit detection. In many games, lag is often frowned upon because it disrupts normal gameplay. The severity of lag depends on the type of game and its inherent tolerance for lag. Some games with a slower pace can tolerate significant delays without any need to compensate at all, whereas others with a faster pace are considerably more sensitive and require extensive use of compensation to be playable (such as the first-person shooter genre). Due to the various problems lag can cause, players that have an insufficiently fast Internet connection are sometimes not permitted, or discouraged from playing with other players or servers that have a distant server host or have high latency to one another. Extreme cases of lag may result in extensive desynchronization of the game state.

Lag due to an insufficient update rate between client and server can cause some problems, but these are generally limited to the client itself. Other players may notice jerky movement and similar problems with the player associated with the affected client, but the real problem lies with the client itself. If the client cannot update the game state at a quick enough pace, the player may be shown outdated renditions of the game, which in turn cause various problems with hit- and collision detection.

Testing has found that overall input lag (from human input to visible response) times of approximately 200 ms are distracting to the user. It also appears that (excluding the monitor/television display lag) 133 ms is an average response time and the most sensitive games (fighting games, first person shooters and rhythm games) achieve response times of 67 ms (excluding display lag).

== Solutions and lag compensation ==
There are various methods for reducing or disguising delays, though many of these have their drawbacks and may not be applicable in all cases. If synchronization is not possible by the game itself, the clients may be able to choose to play on servers in geographical proximity to themselves in order to reduce latencies, or the servers may simply opt to drop clients with high latencies in order to avoid having to deal with the resulting problems. However, these are hardly optimal solutions. Instead, games will often be designed with lag compensation in mind.

Many problems can be solved simply by allowing the clients to keep track of their own state and send absolute states to the server or directly to other clients. For example, the client can state exactly at what position a player's character is or who the character shot. This solution works and will all but eliminate most problems related to lag. Unfortunately, it also relies on the assumption that the client is honest. There is nothing that prevents a player from modifying the data they send, directly at the client or indirectly via a proxy, in order to ensure they will always hit their targets. In online games, the risk of cheating may make this solution unfeasible, and clients will be limited to sending relative states (i.e. which vector it moved on or shot in).

=== Client-side ===
As clients are normally not allowed to define the main game state, but rather receive it from the server, the main task of the client-side compensation is to render the virtual world as accurately as possible. As updates come with a delay and may even be dropped, it is sometimes necessary for the client to predict the flow of the game. Since the state is updated in discrete steps, the client must be able to estimate a movement based on available samples. Two basic methods can be used to accomplish this; extrapolation and interpolation.

Extrapolation is an attempt to estimate a future game state. As soon as a packet from the server is received, the position of an object is updated to the new position. Awaiting the next update, the next position is extrapolated based on the current position and the movement at the time of the update. Essentially, the client will assume that a moving object will continue in the same direction. When a new packet is received, the position may be corrected slightly.

Interpolation works by essentially buffering a game state and rendering the game state to the player with a slight, constant delay. When a packet from the server arrives, instead of updating the position of an object immediately, the client will start to interpolate the position, starting from the last known position. Over an interpolation interval, the object will be rendered moving smoothly between the two positions. Ideally, this interval should exactly match the delay between packets, but due to loss and variable delay, this is rarely the case.

Both methods have advantages and drawbacks.

- Interpolation ensures that objects will move between valid positions only and will produce good results with constant delay and no loss. Should dropped or out-of-order packets overflow the interpolation buffer the client will have to either freeze the object in position until a new packet arrives, or fall back on extrapolation instead. The downside of interpolation is that it causes the world to be rendered with additional latency, increasing the need for some form of lag compensation to be implemented.
- The problem with extrapolating positions is fairly obvious: it is impossible to accurately predict the future. It will render movement correctly only if the movement is constant, but this will not always be the case. Players may change both speed and direction at random. This may result in a small amount of "warping" as new updates arrive and the estimated positions are corrected, and also cause problems for hit detection as players may be rendered in positions that they are not actually in.

Often, in order to allow smooth gameplay, the client is allowed to do soft changes to the game state. While the server may ultimately keep track of ammunition, health, position, etc., the client may be allowed to predict the new server-side game state based on the player's actions, such as allowing a player to start moving before the server has responded to the command. These changes will generally be accepted under normal conditions and make delay mostly transparent. Problems will arise only in the case of high delays or losses, when the client's predictions are very noticeably undone by the server. Sometimes, in the case of minor differences, the server may even allow "incorrect" changes to the state based on updates from the client.

=== Server-side ===
Unlike clients, the server knows the exact current game state, and as such prediction is unnecessary. The main purpose of server-side lag compensation is instead to provide accurate effects of client actions. This is important because by the time a player's command has arrived time will have moved on, and the world will no longer be in the state that the player saw when issuing their command. A very explicit example of this is hit detection for weapons fired in first-person shooters, where margins are small and can potentially cause significant problems if not properly handled.

==== Rewind time ====
Another way to address the issue is to store past game states for a certain length of time, then rewind player locations when processing a command. The server uses the latency of the player (including any inherent delay due to interpolation; see above) to rewind time by an appropriate amount in order to determine what the shooting client saw at the time the shot was fired. This will usually result in the server seeing the client firing at the target's old position and thus hitting. In the worst case, a player will be so far behind that the server runs out of historical data and they have to start leading their targets.

This is a WYSIWYG solution that allows players to aim directly at what they are seeing. But the price is an aggravation of the effects of latency when a player is under fire: not only does their own latency play a part, but their attacker's too. In many situations, this is not noticeable, but players who have just taken cover will notice that they carry on receiving damage/death messages from the server for longer than their own latency can justify. This can lead more often to the (false) impression that they were shot through cover and the (not entirely inaccurate) impression of "laggy hitboxes".

One design issue that arises from rewinding is whether to stop rewinding a dead player's lagged commands as soon as they die on the server, or to continue running them until they "catch up" to the time of death. Cutting compensation off immediately prevents victims from posthumously attacking their killers, which meets expectations, but preserves the natural advantage of moving players who round a corner, acquire a target and kill them in less time than a round trip to the stationary victim's client.

Rewinding can be criticized for allowing the high latency of one player to negatively affect the experience of low-latency players. Servers with lag compensation will sometimes reduce the length of player history stored, or enforce ping limits, to reduce this problem.

==== Trust clients ====
It is possible for clients to tell the server what they are doing and for the server to trust the data it receives. This method is avoided if at all possible due to its susceptibility to cheating: it is a simple matter to route network data through a second computer which inserts fabricated hit messages or modifies existing ones, a technique which cannot be detected by anti-cheat tools.

However, the sheer scale of some games makes computationally expensive solutions like rewinding impossible. In Battlefield 3, for example, a "hybrid hit detection" system is used where clients tell the server that they hit and the server performs only a vague test of plausibility before accepting the claim.

Trusting a client's results otherwise has the same advantages and disadvantages as rewinding.

==== Make clients extrapolate ====
A less common lag solution is to do nothing on the server and to have each client extrapolate (see above) to cover its latency. This produces incorrect results unless remote players maintain a constant velocity, granting an advantage to those who dodge back and forth or simply start/stop moving.

Extended extrapolation also results in remote players becoming visible (though not vulnerable) when they should not be: for example if a remote player sprints up to a corner then stops abruptly at the edge, other clients will render them sprinting onward, into the open, for the duration of their own latency. On the other side of this problem, clients have to give remote players who just started moving an extra burst of speed in order to push them into a theoretically accurate predicted location.

=== Design ===
It is possible to reduce the perception of lag through game design. Techniques include playing client-side animations as if the action took place immediately, reducing/removing built-in timers on the host machine, and using camera transitions to hide warping.

== Cloud gaming ==
Cloud gaming is a type of online gaming where the entire game is hosted on a game server in a data center, and the user is only running a thin client locally that forwards game controller actions upstream to the game server. The game server then renders the next frame of the game video which is compressed using low-lag video compression and is sent downstream and decompressed by the thin client. For the cloud gaming experience to be acceptable, the round-trip lag of all elements of the cloud gaming system (the thin client, the Internet and/or LAN connection the game server, the game execution on the game server, the video and audio compression and decompression, and the display of the video on a display device) must be low enough that the user perception is that the game is running locally. Because of such tight lag requirements, distance considerations of the speed of light through optical fiber come into play, currently limiting the distance between a user and a cloud gaming game server to approximately 1000 miles, according to OnLive. There is also much controversy about the lag associated with cloud gaming. In multiplayer games using a client/server network architecture, the player's computer renders the game's graphics locally and only information about the player's in-game actions are sent to the server. For example, when the player presses a button, the character on-screen instantly performs the corresponding action. However, the consequences of the action such as an enemy being killed are only seen after a short delay due to the time taken for the action to reach the server. This is only acceptable as long as the response to the player's input is fast enough.

When using cloud gaming, inputs by the player can lead to short delays until a response can be seen by them. Inputs must first be transmitted to the remote server, then the server must start rendering the graphics of the action being performed and stream the video back to the player over the network, taking additional time. Thus, the player experiences a noticeable delay between pressing a button and seeing something happen on-screen. Depending on the skill and experience of the player, this can cause disorientation and confusion similar to Delayed Auditory Feedback and hampers navigation and aiming in the game world. When rapidly inputting a long combination move, the on-screen character will not be synchronized with the button presses. This usually causes severe confusion in the player resulting in the failure of the combination move.

The extra input lag can also make it very difficult to play certain single player games. For example, if an enemy takes a swing at the player and the player is expected to block, then by the time the player's screen shows that the enemy has commenced attacking, the enemy would have already struck and killed the player on the server.

== Special Use ==
=== "Ka le" In Dota 2 ===
Ka le or Kale, /ˈkɑːlɜː/, is a gaming slang and Internet phrase referring to lag. It is from Chinese phrase 卡了 (pinyin: Kǎle) and was first used in Dota 2 Asia Championships 2015, when some Chinese players typed it in chat to complain about their annoying game lags and request to pause. As the Chinese Dota 2 scene became popular, this expression became known as well. Many western players, professionals and amateurs alike, often type "kale" instead of "lag" in in-game chat and Twitch.

== See also ==
- Response time (technology)
