= Development of Overwatch =

Development of the video game

Overwatch is a team-based first-person shooter developed by Blizzard Entertainment and released for Microsoft Windows, PlayStation 4, and Xbox One in May 2016. The game, while having several different play modes, generally features two teams of six players each, selecting pre-made heroes from the game's roster, to either attack or defend various objective points on the game's maps. The game supports casual game modes as well as ranked competitive play. Since release, Overwatch has been both critically and financially successful, with a player base of 35 million players as of October 2017.

The development of Overwatch started in the fallout following Blizzard's decision to cancel continued development of the massively multiplayer online role-playing game Titan around 2013. After most of the rest of the team was transferred to other projects, the remaining team members, led by director Jeff Kaplan, came up with the concept of a team-based shooter that borrowed elements from other online shooters like Team Fortress 2 and multiplayer online battle arenas. Many of Overwatch's early assets were borrowed from Titan to obtain a proof-of-concept to greenlight further development. The consequences of Titan's cancellation also led into creating a narrative of an optimistic near-future setting for the game, taking place some decades after the formation of the peacekeeping Overwatch team, created in response to a robotic uprising known as the Omnic War.

Since release, the Overwatch developments continue to produce more content, released free for all, for the title, including new hero characters, maps, game modes, seasonal events, customization options for the characters, and external media such as digital comics and shorts to help support the narrative and character's backstories. Blizzard has also made changes to make Overwatch more compatible for professional esports, including support for its Overwatch League that started its first season in January 2018.

== Development ==
=== Concept ===
Development of Overwatch followed after the cancellation of the ambitious massively multiplayer online role-playing game Titan, a game that had been in development at Blizzard for seven years since around 2007. Overwatch director Jeff Kaplan said that Titan was a class-based shooter game, with each class having a core set of abilities that the player would expand upon via a skill tree progression; these skills got more powerful the farther the player progressed, and Kaplan said that it ended up being "very cluttered and confused". Blizzard co-founder Michael Morhaime stated that with Titan, "We didn't find the fun. We didn't find the passion." even after re-evaluating the project.

Titan was canceled internally by May 2013 in what became known as the "White Chair Meeting", where management had set up white chairs in their longue to announce the cancellation. The large Titan team of 140 members was broken up: 80 were permanently relocated to other divisions in Blizzard, twenty put on loan to other Blizzard projects, and the remaining 40 tasked to come up with a new project within six weeks, otherwise they would be assigned to other groups within Blizzard. Among ideas tossed suggested by this time was Crossroads, an MMO set in an outpost in space that would have been a crossroads for many different alien species. This game would have featured several different character classes, upwards of fifty, which Kaplan thought would be difficult but remained a core concept of Crossroads. They also considered developing a tie-in to the Starcraft universe, focused around individual characters within that universe.

Creative director Chris Metzen noted that to avoid the same failure that Titan became, their group had to rethink how Blizzard's more successful games had come about, ignoring the scale and business opportunity of the result and instead understand what tools and skills they had already to build from. In brainstorming ideas, the team thought about the current state of first-person shooters (FPS), a genre that many on the team had played throughout their careers, which has enjoyed many groundbreaking titles but still has a potential for innovation, according to Kaplan. Kaplan stated that some of the ideas in the current FPS they wanted to emulate were the use of in-game maneuvers like rocket jumping and grappling hooks that helped players move with fluidity across maps and team-based shooters such as Team Fortress Classic and Team Fortress 2. At the same time, multiplayer online battle arena (MOBA) games were starting to take off, which required players to cooperate with others to successfully win the match. Kaplan said that their team considered how to adapt the large-scale and fast-paced gameplay of Team Fortress 2 with the smaller scale and cooperative nature of MOBAs, forming the basis of Overwatch. Metzen also commented that the concept of teamwork in Overwatch was partially influenced by their own team's current morale following the cancellation of Titan. Metzen said that during Titan's development, the team was highly fractured which impacted the project's cancellation. On starting Overwatch with a smaller group, they all wanted to come together and support each other to make their next game a success, "a redemption story for us as people and as craftsmen". Morhaime described Overwatch's intention as to "create an awesome [first-person shooter] experience that's more accessible to a much wider audience while delivering the action and depth that shooter fans love." On the FPS nature of the game, Kaplan commented that "the real focus of the shooting in the game is not to chase realism. We don't have real world guns in the game. You're not playing a soldier in a present-day military conflict." Simplicity of design was a high-value goal, taking cues from the success of the simple approach used in Blizzard's Hearthstone.

From a narrative and artistic standpoint, Overwatch's approach came out of emotional impact of the failed Titan development. Kaplan said his small team was "very nervous about our future" when tasked to come up with a new game concept, but this soon solidified into the idea of "a future worth fighting for", which had also been a phrase used internally for Titan's development. This gave them the idea to set the game in a near future, and started evaluating other games set in the same period, including recent Call of Duty and Battlefield games as well as The Last of Us and Fallout 4, but found all these titles presented a dark version of the future. Further, they were aware that of the various expansions for World of Warcraft, The Burning Crusade, had some of the least-visited areas, which they attributed to the oppressive visuals. Instead of these darker futures, they wanted to present a narrative and world that was more optimistic with brighter visuals that would help draw in players.

The heroes as designed for the 2013 Prometheus prototype, which Aaron Keller attributed to allowing the project to move forward

With core ideas down, the remaining Titan team began putting these together as a prototype to present to management under the codename Prometheus, according to Aaron Keller. They took the classes they had made for Titan and remade these as Heroes, giving them core abilities from the Titan skill set they believed worked best together, and developing backstory and personality for the heroes. Existing art assets from Titan for the various player avatars were also reused and refined to create the appearance of the heroes. The initial gameplay used maps they had developed for Titan along with Tracer, one of the reworked Titan heroes; at that point, they had not included any animations so Tracer would fire by shooting lasers out of her eyes. The prototype proved successful within Blizzard, and the team was given the greenlight to proceed. Keller said that when they showed the image of the heroes that they had redesigned for Prometheus to management at an October 2013 pitch meeting, that was "the moment where the room transformed from doubtful to excited about what this game could be." Overwatch became Blizzard's second attempt at launching a new franchise since StarCraft in 1998. Some of the additional heroes came from the classes they created for the Crossroads concept as well as the Starcraft tie-in that they brainstormed prior to settling on Overwatch.

=== Technical development ===
Once greenlit from the October 2013 pitch meeting, the team had about 13 months to complete a version of the game to announce at the November 2014 BlizzCon. Initial development of the game began with creating the first Hero character, Tracer, who was based on a character from Titan with similar time-manipulation abilities. They used Tracer and a single map based on the Temple of Anubis, to test how well the core mechanics played, according to assistant game director Aaron Keller. They added three more Heroes—Widowmaker, Reaper, and Pharah, all of whom had been developed from Crossroads classes—to start polishing the gameplay mechanics, which even at this stage Keller stated that it compared very closely with what the released game would present. They had even considered releasing Overwatch with a limited set of heroes at this point, as they had felt the game already had a finished feel to it.

Instead, they spent about two years on developing out the rest of the characters, gameplay balance, and graphics. Characters were generally added to the game for one of three reasons: to introduce a new gameplay mechanic or balance gameplay, to incorporate a new character design created by their artistic team, or to help support Overwatch's narrative. Some characters were adaptions from the Titan classes: Reinhardt had started as the "Juggernaut" character from Titan, for example. In addition to character balance, the development team needed to find ways to balance the characters with the various maps, wanting to provide areas across the maps for each character to have an area where they could be effective. The number of characters in the game was not fixed; though released with 21 different heroes, Kaplan stated the team played around with various goals, potentially as high as 40 unique heroes and across six different classes. Kaplan knew they had to have more than nine heroes as to separate themselves from Team Fortress 2, which featured nine distinct classes. Kaplan credits Geoff Goodman, a veteran designer in Blizzard, for figuring out the right number of heroes, classes, and balance between the characters. Keller noted that as the cast approached 15 characters, the team started to worry that there were too many for players to learn and may dilute the experience, but they strived to assure both uniqueness and balance across the slate of Heroes. The team felt the game was ready for release in November 2015 after adding the last two characters, Mei and D.Va, to the roster.

Overwatch was developed with half a dozen features to bring in a wider audience, including an accessibility feature for color blind individuals. During development, one important goal was to have "combat clarity" for the player, so that when a player moved into a new area, enemy characters would be clearly visible. This was enabled by contrasting the hues and saturation levels used for players to those used within the maps, and creating characters with distinctly different silhouettes to allow a player to identify the hero from a distance, including whether they were friend or foe. They found during development that having players be able to change heroes in mid-match to be important to gameplay. This inspired them to forego plans to release Overwatch as a free-to-play model with microtransactions or with paid downloadable content but instead make it a single-purchase title. Keller said that they wanted players to be able to jump to any Hero as necessitated by the situation, and the free-to-play or downloadable content approach could limit that ability if none of the team's players had purchased access to that hero. Keller also stated that the free-to-play/downloadable content model could fragment their player community, with gamers only playing with friends that had the same content instead of all available players. Prior to this change, Kaplan had been calling the game "Monetized Shooter" in internal pitches to management, but producer Matt Hawley said he would refuse to present the game as that and demanded Kaplan find another name. Kaplan opted for "Overwatch", a name that had been tossed around for Titan prior to its cancellation.

The game's engine was developed from scratch within Blizzard as to target a wide range of personal computers, including laptops that use integrated graphics processors. Senior software engineer Ryan Greene said that they looked to create a hardware "minspec" that would assure the game ran at nearly 30 frames-per-second on these lower-end machines, which once met would allow higher end machines as well as the consoles to run at 60 frames-per-second, as well as optimizing other performance-related issues.

A further goal in development was to avoid the negativity that often occurs in other competitive game environments, and, along with strides to make the narrative give a positive message, made specific choices in gameplay design to remove elements they felt fed negativity. One such choice was omitting kill/death ratios from the various statistic summaries, as according to Kaplan "some characters don’t need to kill to be effective". To promote a friendlier playing environment, Blizzard penalizes players that "rage quit" (purposely leaving a match before it is complete) with a penalty on player experience points after a match, and will permanently ban players that they find "cheating or using hacks, bots, or third-party software".

While the game's primary gameplay modes were easily developed to account for unique abilities of all characters, the developers also had thought about a Capture the Flag mode for several years, recognizing that most team-based first-person shooters included some type of variant on this mode. The largest issue that this mode faced was the speed or warping abilities of some of the characters, like Tracer, which could pick up the flag and warp back to their base, leaving the other team unable to stop them. Thus they would either find matches reduced to players selecting the speediest characters, or having to put so many restrictions in place that the result game no longer felt like Overwatch. Over several iterations, they devised a scheme that they put to public testing in January 2017 through the "Capture the Rooster" special event to celebrate the Chinese New Year; here, to prevent speedy characters from running immediately after collecting the flag, they must wait a few seconds before they can run or use their special powers, leaving them vulnerable for that period. Initially having no plans to retain the Capture the Flag mode after the event, Blizzard announced that they will keep the event as a custom game mode with additional options.

Blizzard's initial idea for competitive mode were to limit play to six-on-six matches where players had formed their own teams outside of normal matchmaking, with rankings based on team rather than individual performance; Kaplan stated that this would avoid issues relating to matchmaking and players dropping out mid-game in terms of tracking the team's rating. When they presented this concept to players early on, they received a large amount of negative feedback, with many players wanting to be able to play competitively solo rather than grouped with a team. From this feedback, they redesigned competitive mode to be based on a progression system, similar to Hearthstone, where initially a player would generally progress along a five-tier ladder system the more matches they played, but as they moved into higher ranks, would find further progression to be based more on skill. This approach had been tested in the beta period but Blizzard found that low-ranked players tended to be pitted frequently against much more highly ranked players, and that they had not accounted for players to fall out of a tier if they started to perform poorly. They further found players wanting a finer resolution of their competitive ranking to be able to better compare to other players. They opted to hold back on including competitive mode at release, and later redeveloped the mode to use the 100-point ranking system to meet these issues while continuing to look for other ways to improve the ranking system.

An improved competitive mode entered open beta testing within Battle.net's public test region on June 21, 2016. Competitive mode for Windows, Xbox One and PlayStation 4 was added on June 28, June 30 and July 1, 2016, respectively.

The United States Patent and Trademark Office suspended Blizzard's application for a trademark for Overwatch due to "a likelihood of confusion" with a previously registered trademark by Innovis Labs. On October 13, 2015, Innovis Labs and Blizzard settled a pending lawsuit. A week later, on October 21, 2015, Innovis Labs surrendered their trademark registration for Overwatch.

=== Narrative and setting ===
To develop the game's themes, Kaplan stated that they wanted to create a future that was not typical of what a post-apocalyptic world might be like, opting instead for a future where conflict still exists but a "bright and aspirational vision" is maintained. The title's creative director, Chris Metzen, acknowledged that parts of Overwatch, such as maps, share "continuity" with Titan. Citing a desire to keep its game styles "simple", and because it contradicted its emphasis on accomplishing goals as a team rather than trying to achieve large numbers of kills, Overwatch does not contain a traditional deathmatch mode. Metzen stated that "we have a long legacy of developing multiplayer games, and it came down to 'is it even possible to build a shooter that doesn't feel cynical, that doesn't feel cruel, that doesn't feel nasty? Can you build one that really promotes teamwork and relationship and having fun with your friends, and not getting killed with a thrown knife from halfway across the map as soon as you jump in?'"

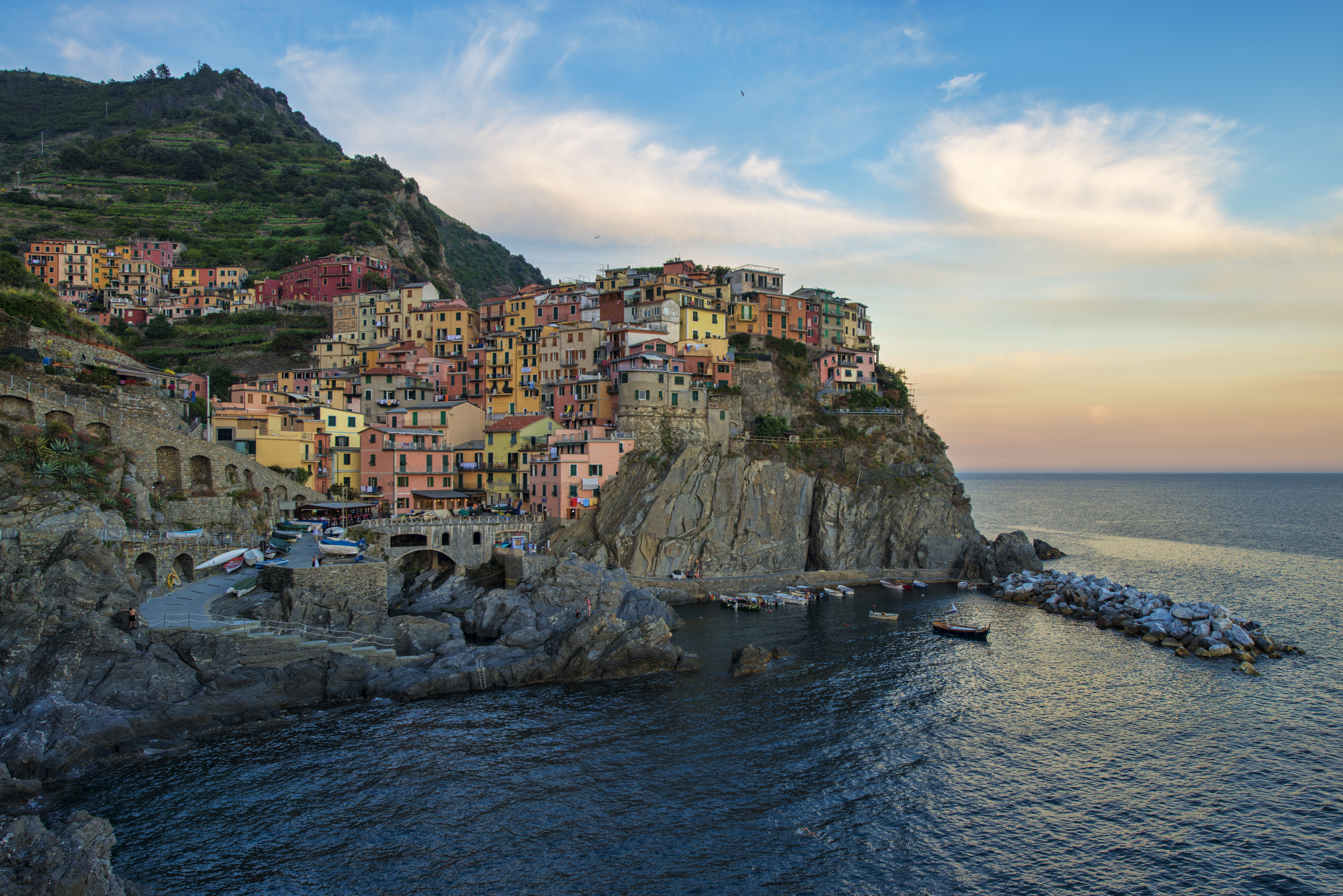
The visuals for the Mexico-based Dorado map were inadvertently inspired by the mountainside-homes of Manarola, Italy.

Kaplan has expressed that this theme continued into the aesthetics of the game, commenting, "when it comes to the setting and art style and tone of the universe, a lot of games like to approach the future in either a very dystopian way, or a post-apocalyptic way," and adding, "we wanted to make something bright and welcoming, that featured a lot of deep, rich colors. A lot of the modern realistic games tend to focus on gritty gray, brown palettes." Several of the initial maps, Ilios, Dorado, and Nepal, were developed based on the idea of vacation spots and drew from various imagery of those locations. Kaplan noted that Dorado, set in Mexico, was inspired by a photograph they found while searching for images of colorful Mexican towns, but only later realized that the photo was that of Manarola, Italy. Others, like the Hollywood map, were created by a multicultural team that used only their perception of what Hollywood was like, rather than any reference material, with the result being better than a realistic version, according to Kaplan. A more recent map, Oasis, set in Iraq, was portrayed as "one of the most technologically-advanced places in the world" to contrast how other games set in the near-future present the country as ravaged by war.

The narrative for Overwatch is led by Blizzard's senior game designer Michael Chu. Creating a narrative for the game was a challenge compared to past Blizzard titles as the game lacks a single-player mode or a traditional story-telling mechanic. Instead, the story crafters for the game sought to create a spanning narrative that could be interjected into the game through short in-game dialogue and unlockable hero skins. A March 2017 patch for the game added short character biographies, as well as lore details about specific character skins in the Hero Gallery. Outside of the game, the narrative is primarily driven by a transmedia storytelling method, which includes animated shorts and digitally released comics. This gives the developers some flexibility as to where they can take the story as Overwatch is expanded over the years. The narrative can still be seen being hinted at through map environments and character dialogue within the game itself; Chu explains that "you get a character like Soldier: 76 and he says, like: 'back in my day we'd have this payload delivered'. And then you get a character like Zenyatta, the robot monk, and he would say something like, "becoming one with the objective." So we find these ways to really differentiate them and it makes for unexpected and sometimes ridiculous lines." Blizzard also found ways to include narrative elements through limited-time events, such as the "Junkenstein's Revenge" event during October 2016 and the April 2017 "Uprising" event. Chu said that with these types of events, they will encourage players to explore the other forms of media that Blizzard is using to develop the Overwatch narrative, as well as prompt fans to continue to explore and speculate on the world and characters they created.

Blizzard felt they had strength in developing a narrative for a large universe of characters as they had done for Warcraft. Chu expressed that they wanted to diverge from the fantasy and science fiction elements that were prominent in their main three franchises (Warcraft, StarCraft, and Diablo), stating "we wanted to try something different with Overwatch, so what we decided to go for was the future of Earth. We always wanted the game to be about heroes, so we took a lot of inspiration from comics and superhero stories of our youth and today." Once it was determined Overwatch would be played on a near-futuristic version of Earth, the writers recognized the possibility of having a global-spanning set of characters and locations set in an "inspirational future". Metzen sees the Overwatch universe as having potential dynamics over time, but Blizzard does not yet have plans for how to implement this within the game.

=== Characters ===
The playable characters in Overwatch were meant to be a diverse cast, covering a broad range of genders and ethnicities, including non-human characters.

The cast of playable characters in Overwatch was selected to portray diverse representations of genders and ethnicities, including males, females, and non-human characters such as robots and a gorilla. The need for a diverse cast was important to the developers, as some of Blizzard's previous games had been criticized before for missing this mark; Metzen explained that even his daughter had asked him why all the female characters from Warcraft seemed to be only wearing swimsuits. Metzen stated: "Specifically for Overwatch over the past year we've been really cognizant of that, trying not to oversexualize the female characters." Kaplan explained that the industry was "clearly in an age where gaming is for everybody," going on to say that "increasingly, people want to feel represented, from all walks of life, boys and girls, everybody. We feel indebted to do our best to honor that." Michael Chu expressed that the diverse group of characters is a result of Blizzard's approach to game design, elaborating that "We've tried [to] have a diverse cast of characters and diverse locations that you go through, and hopefully these characters - even beyond national diversity; just seeing their personalities, their backstories, their occupations - hopefully people will find things in common with these characters."

Overwatch's diversity also extends to other character facets. Blizzard has said that some of the characters have LGBT identities; Metzen said that the inclusion of LGBT characters was not "to be a data point or feel contrived in any way", but instead to have these identities "play out organically". Tracer was the first identified as one of the LGBT characters via one of the promotional online comics. Blizzard said on this reveal "as with any aspect of our characters' backgrounds, their sexuality is just one part of what makes our heroes who they are. From the very beginning of our work on Tracer's story, it just felt right to make this an aspect of her character." Blizzard reiterated their goal to have a diverse cast with Tracer's reveal, stating, "from the beginning, we've wanted the universe of Overwatch to feel welcoming and inclusive, and to reflect the diversity of our players around the world." Additional lore released in January 2019 revealed that Soldier: 76 had been in a same-sex relationship earlier in this life, making him the second LGBT character on the roster. Similarly, the character of Symmetra is considered autistic by the development team, with Kaplan saying, "we think she does a great job of representing just how awesome someone with autism can be".

The team envisioned the characters akin to superheroes in this narrative, each with their own abilities, background and personality that could stand on their own, but could also fit into the larger story; this notion translated into the characters being agents for the game, which Metzen said still captures the "heroism and vibe" that superhero stories carry. The team did not want to have any characters that served solely as villains in the game, but did develop some of the characters, like Soldier: 76, to have an unsure purpose within the narrative. Several characters evolved out of the characters and their abilities they had developed for Titan, including Tracer, Widowmaker, Bastion, Soldier: 76, Symmetra, Torbjorn, and Reinhardt. Characters were designed to avoid outright characters stereotypes. In some cases such as Cassidy, they took a stereotypical character but created a story and approach to embrace the stereotype. Other cases was presenting a character one would never typically see in a modern game, such as Ana, an older mother who remains a skilled sniper. The choice of Tracer as the cover art was purposely to contrast Overwatch from most other shooter games that feature a grizzled-looking older male soldier, with Kaplan saying this was to show that "normal things are normal".

Kaplan credits artist Arnold Tsang for the preliminary designs of all the heroes in the game. The narrative and characters were then developed through an iterative process between the developers, artists, and media promoters. Torbjörn was considered the game's defining character, despite not being created first, because his art style sought to bridge the gap between the Warcraft series and Overwatch. Blizzard art director Sam Didier reviewed Tsang's original design, refining the art design that led to Torbjörn's gameplay mechanics. Torbjörn's appearance was used as a baseline in all other character and map designs for cohesion. Similarly, the character Doomfist was first introduced through a promotional video displaying his gauntlet, then through the Numbani launch map clarifying that "Doomfist" was a title, and finally through the character's release as the fourth post-launch hero. Other examples of iterative character expansion include the rivals Genji and Hanzo who were split from an earlier character concept based on The Tale of Genji, and the introduction of Lúcio to develop the Vishkar Corporation of Symmetra's backstory. Activision Blizzard CEO Bobby Kotick specifically cited the uniqueness of Tsang's designs as the basis for his approval of the game's conversion from the cancelled Titan project into a hero shooter.

Character animations were created by Blizzard's David Gibson. To help give more personality to the 3D-rendered animation, Gibson applied traditional methods used in 2D limited animation, such as smear animation, instead of relying on motion blur, creating more exaggerated animations that support the feel of the game.

=== Announcement and release ===
Overwatch was formally announced at the BlizzCon event on November 7, 2014; the game was playable during the event to all attendees, with fourteen characters available to select from. During this event Blizzard released a cinematic trailer and an extended gameplay video for the game. According to Keller, the response to the trailer and demonstration was beyond what they expected. Dion Rogers, art director for Overwatch, said that the crowd at BlizzCon were very response to the trailer that featured Winston, and "It was this ape that was smart and intelligent, and it really showed the difference between our hero shooter and what was out there at the time." A month after the BlizzCon event, in December 2014, Blizzard published character introduction videos to its YouTube channel, and followed up on this May 2015 by posting weekly videos of game footage and character highlights.

Buoyed by the response from players, the Overwatch team asked themselves if they could push on their planned release date by the end of 2015, but instead opted to delay into 2016 to apply more policy. Instead, Blizzard offered a closed beta period for Overwatch across all three platforms began on October 27, 2015, to help with this final polishing step. The closed beta was put on "extended break" in December and brought back in February 2016. Following the March 2016 release announcement, Blizzard also announced an open beta period from May 5 to 9 for any registered user of the Battle.net client. The open beta proven popular with Blizzard reporting over 9.7 million players participating, and as a way of showing thanks, extended the open beta period by one extra day. The game was formally released on May 24, 2016.

=== Post-release development and support ===
Blizzard has pledged to support the game through various updates. Nearly all such updates are made available for testing on a special region called the Public Test Region (PTR) which any player can select instead of their local geographic region. In February 2020, Blizzard plans to add an "experimental card" to the game where they will test elements that are not related to debugging but for testing game balance, such as tweaking of gameplay rules or character abilities. Players will be able to access the experimental card from any region and are optional modes to the main gameplay elements.

Some updates included features promised as part of the long-term release plan. as the competitive mode that was added in June 2016, and potential changes to how the Play of the Game is selected to showcase non-attacking-based Heroes. Other updates will come from monitoring the game and adjusting various attributes of the Heroes to better manage their expectations they had in designing the game and in response to player feedback. For example, one of the first planned updates was to change the strength of Cassidy's alternate fire "Fan the Hammer" ability, which could do a great deal of damage to most targets. Blizzard felt this attack should be lethal to most of the Heroes but should not be able to take out Tank-based characters in a single shot, and reduced the damage to address this. Similarly, Symmetra had major character update in late 2016 that gave her additional abilities including a second Ultimate ability, the changes made in response to Blizzard's observations that she had been infrequently selected by players. Kaplan said that while they do want to promote lesser-played heroes, their goal of these updates is not to strive for equal selection rates for all heroes, but to work with the fluctuations in the meta-game as new heroes are introduced and new strategies by players are developed to counter new heroes or updates made to other heroes. Kaplan described their overall approach in these post-release adjustments as part of a "balance triangle", weighing the various statistics they collect, the feedback and general attitudes from the player base they monitor, and their own personal opinions and gut feelings where the balance should be. Not all three points are equally weighed, but they consider avoiding allowing one of these areas overwhelm the other two.

Not all updates will be equivalent across platforms; a planned update will reduce the damage of Torbjörn's auto-aiming turrets on console versions but will not be applied to the Windows version, while a later patch for consoles helped to improve the precision of aiming with controller analog sticks. In September 2016, Blizzard added in support for high bandwidth network play on the Windows client for users with sufficient Internet connections, which reduces the amount of interpolation delay in client and server-side prediction, making the game smoother and more reactive for those players. Players on slower bandwidth connections are grouped with others of this type to avoid any disadvantage of connection speed. Blizzard is looking for how to implement high bandwidth support in the console versions.

At launch, there were no plans for a version of Overwatch for OS X, with Kaplan saying that the OS X architecture and their optimizations for Overwatch were "just too challenging" to support initially. Kaplan has stated that they have looked into a version for the Nintendo Switch which they considered similarly challenging due to its specifications, and would complicate the nature of updating the game in a timely fashion on all consoles, but still consider the platform a viable one for the game.

Blizzard has plans to add new characters and maps to the game. With respect to characters, Kaplan expected they will release these one at a time, rather than in groups, allowing the new character to be stabilized before adding the next. Kaplan referred to the negative feedback received after the grouped introduction of the final three characters—Genji, Mei, and D.Va—during the closed beta period, which if repeated could be "disruptive" to the game's community. For example, the first new character, Ana, was revealed and playable on the Public Test region from July 12, 2016, and made available to all on the Windows version on July 19 with console versions following in the days after. Other characters like Sombra were added in a similar manner, along with other new features. In regards to maps, the first new map added, "Eichenwalde", was on August 16, 2016, first available in the PTR before being offered to all players. New maps are developed to be as future proof as possible in considering the potential of new characters. Blizzard level designer Aaron Keller led map designs to make sure that players were generally contained within the expected battle path, and was fortunate enough with a character with near limited flying ability, Pharah, was available from the start as part of this testing. Keller noted that with introduction of Wrecking Ball, a character capable of rolling and grappling for fast maneuvering, future maps may have sections well tailored to new characters like Wrecking Ball. Keller strove to give each character an equal number of maps the can excel on.

Blizzard is also able to add in new game modes and cosmetics, such as sprays and skins, among other things. Themed limited-time modes and cosmetics have also been made available for events and holidays, such as the 2016 Summer Olympics or Halloween. Some of these additions are derived from player feedback to Blizzard. In the case of the "Overwatch Uprising" event during April 2017, Kaplan said that players wanted to have more story put into the game, inspiring them to create a new story-driven player-vs-environment mode set during Overwatch's past that helped to create some new narrative and provide cosmetic items to reflect that. In May 2019, Blizzard introduced "The Workshop", a script-based environment for players to create their own custom game modes. According to Keith Miron and Dan Reed, software and gameplay engineers for Blizzard, the development team knew they wanted to explore options for players in custom games. As a result of a "hack-a-thon" in 2017, they had developed a simple scripting language that could be used to create custom games for those that were not programmers. The work was put on hold until late 2018, following another hack-a-thon event where they fleshed out more game ideas and scripting to support it, at which point it was determined to make this a feature of Overwatch.

Blizzard has said it is committed to maintaining a competitive landscape for the game and will take proactive steps to prevent cheating through hacks and other tricks. Blizzard performed one such mass-ban of players they had found to be using aimbots and other cheating assistants in late July 2016. Following Overwatch's release, Blizzard sought legal action against Bossland Hacks for Watchover Tyrant tool that enables certain cheats and advantages to players in Overwatch, among other features, eventually winning the case by default and being awarded $8.5 million in damages. To this end, Blizzard has also explicitly warned users of using third-party applications that provide additional in-game feedback to players about their performance, such as Visor, software that fed into an artificial intelligence system to provide additional information in-match to the player's performance, and Pursuit, which tracked players' performance and gave additional statistics after the conclusion of a match.

Blizzard had also emphasized the need to prevent Overwatch from becoming a toxic environment, with Kaplan saying that they want to remove players that frequently contribute toxicity from the game. By September 2017, Blizzard has taken action over 480,000 users, including 340,000 reported by other users, but have encouraged the community to continue to help support these efforts. Due to the rise of toxic behavior in the game, the Blizzard team has had to slow down development of additional content to deal with reports of toxic players. An endorsement system was added in June 2018 to discourage toxicity. Through this, players can give up to three endorsements in leadership, teamwork, and sportsmanship to any other player after a match. Players receiving endorsements gain experience that can help lead to earning loot box rewards faster, and players that continually receive endorsements are favored in the matchmaking system. According to Blizzard, by March 2019, the endorsement system had helped to reduce disruptive behavior in the game by up to 40%, and through surveys, players found the system to be trustworthy, helping to enforce the value of the endorsement system.

A major change to the game was announced in July 2019, called "Role Queue". Prior to this, players in Quickplay and Competitive modes could select any heroes at any point in the match. With the Role Queue requires players to select one of the three roles, Damage, Tank, and Support, before QuickPlay or Competitive games, which limits them to playing and switching between those heroes for the duration of the game. Players then would be matched so that each team would have two of each role. Groups of players would need to make sure their group does not exceed this before joining a match. Changes were made to support the Role Queue: competitive players would have separate skill rankings for each role, while heroes like Brigitte, originally designs to have some flexible capabilities between roles, would be adjusted to better fit their intended role. The intent of the change according to Kaplan was to "improve match quality, give players more control over their gameplay experience, and provide more positive social experiences between teammates." However, many observers believed the change was needed to combat the popular "GOATS" composition - a three-tank, three-support team named for the Overwatch Contenders team that popularized this. GOATS proved difficult to disrupt by opposing teams unless they also played GOATS. The GOATS composition had been dominating both Overwatch League play for most of its 2019 season, and was very common in normal competitive play, causing players and viewers to become disinterested. The Role Queue eliminates GOATS and thus expected to bring new life to Overwatch according to journalists. The Role Queue was introduced on the PTR in July 2019, and a short 2-week competitive season was held in August 2019 to test the system across all platforms before its full planned release in September 2019.

Separately, Blizzard, through its China regional offices, have taken developer 4399 to court over its mobile title Heroes of Warfare in October 2017, citing it as a clone in art, heroes, and gameplay design from Overwatch; this is the second such cloned title produced by 4399, the first that Blizzard had already succeeded in having removed from the various app stores. Blizzard and NetEase won the lawsuit by November 2019, with US$569,000 awarded in damages for the copyright violations on both games.

Overwatch was playable through backward compatibility on the next console generation, the Xbox Series X and Series S and the PlayStation 5, launched in November 2020. Blizzard released a performance optimization patch for the Xbox Series X/S version on March 9, 2020, that allowed players to run the game at up to 120 frames per second on supported monitors.

== Marketing ==
In the week prior to release, Blizzard arranged to have three giant-sized boxes (approximately 15 feet (4.6 m) tall) of various Overwatch heroes, as if being sold as packaged action figures, put on display across the globe at Hollywood, Paris, and Busan, South Korea. The displays were created by Alliance Studios, led by Steve Wang, who has collaborated with Blizzard before on past projects, and Eddie Yang. After planning the design of the sculptures in January 2016, teams across the world, including Droga5, Scicon, Stratasys and Egads, raced to print, finish and assemble the works in time for the game's release. Propelled by Overwatch, Blizzard had over 50% of the American advertisement share among gaming industry brands from May 16 to June 15, 2016.

Overwatch was released for Microsoft Windows, PlayStation 4, and Xbox One platforms on May 24, 2016, with the game servers coming online at 00:00 BST that day. Blizzard allowed retailers to sell physical copies of the game on May 23 to help players prepare for the servers' launch. The game will be supported by updates, including new maps and characters. All of the additional content will be free for existing players and does not require additional payment. Blizzard hoped that through this method they can alleviate the concerns of some players.

Two special editions of Overwatch were released alongside the base game. The Origins Edition, available both as a downloadable and retail product, includes the base game and five additional character skins, as well as other bonus items for other Blizzard games via Battle.net. The Collectors Edition, only available as retail, includes the Origins Edition content as well as a statue of Soldier: 76, one of the playable characters, along with the game's soundtrack and a source book. Those that purchased either the Origins or Collectors Editions received the Baby Winston battle pet in World of Warcraft. Blizzard released a digital Game of the Year edition of Overwatch in honor of its first anniversary on May 23, 2017; it includes all content from the Origins Edition, in addition to ten free loot boxes.

Blizzard has expressed interest in supporting cross-platform play between console systems in the future, though has no plans for Windows-supported cross-play due to the precision advantage of keyboard and mouse controls over controller-based ones.

== Related media and merchandise ==
Blizzard opted to tell the story of Overwatch across various mediums, rather than include a story mode; Chu stated, "One of the things that's really great is we're able to leverage the strengths of these different mediums to tell different parts of the story," citing Soldier: 76's appearances in fake news reports, an animated video narrated from his perspective, as well as the Hero short. Chu has also remarked that the reasoning for Blizzard's method of storytelling with Overwatch was an emphasis on a "gameplay first" philosophy.

In March 2016, Blizzard announced that they would be releasing comics and animated shorts based on Overwatch in 2016. The related media included plans for a graphic novel called Overwatch: First Strike, which would have focused on the story of several in-game characters including Soldier: 76, Torbjörn, Reaper, and Reinhardt. The novel was to be penned by writer Micky Neilson and artist Ludo Lullabi. Blizzard opted to cancel First Strike in November 2016, with Chu stating that since the announcement of the graphic novel, Overwatch's narrative development has gone in a somewhat different direction, changing out these origin stories would work. Blizzard still plans to reveal more of the characters' backstory in time.

Blizzard began releasing the series of animated shorts in March 2016; the shorts maintained the style of the game's cinematic trailer, which centered on a battle in which Tracer and Winston fought Reaper and Widowmaker in the Overwatch Museum. A collection of these cinematic sequences played in movie theaters across the United States as part of the game's launch event. The first episode of the animated short series, Recall, was released on March 23. It centers on Winston and Reaper, and features flashbacks to Winston's childhood. The second episode, Alive, showcased a standoff between Tracer and Widowmaker, and was released on April 5. The third episode, Dragons, featuring the brothers Hanzo and Genji, was released on May 16. The fourth and final episode of the series' first season, Hero, stars Soldier: 76, and was released May 22.

Overwatch characters and elements have been brought over to the crossover MOBA game Heroes of the Storm. Nine characters (Note: Tracer, Zarya, Lúcio, Genji, D.Va, Ana, Junkrat, Hanzo, and Mei are playable characters in Heroes of the Storm) appear as playable heroes in the game, along with battlegrounds based on the Overwatch maps Hanamura and Volskaya Industries. Tracer debuted as a playable character in the video game Heroes of the Storm in its April 2016 update, nearly a month prior to the release of Overwatch. Hanzo has been added alongside Alexstrasza as part of the "Dragons of the Nexus" event in December 2017. A number of Overwatch-themed skins have been introduced for Heroes of the Storm in the “Overwatch cosplay” event in May 2021.

Blizzard and Dark Horse Comics announced a partnership at the 2016 San Diego Comic-Con that will have Dark Horse publish the existing Overwatch comics to date under their label as well as future comics, and will publish a 100-page art book The Art of Overwatch to be released mid-2017.

Funko has produced several Overwatch character figurines in their Pop line since the game's launch. Good Smile Company announced they will produce Nendoroid figurines of various Overwatch characters in 2017 and onward, starting with Tracer, and followed by Mercy and Mei.
