= Interlaced video =

Technique for doubling the perceived frame rate of a video display

Animation of an interlaced CRT TV display, showing odd and even fields being scanned in sequence, to display a full frame

Interlaced video (also known as interlaced scan) is a technique for doubling the perceived frame rate of a video display without consuming extra bandwidth. The interlaced signal contains two fields of a video frame captured consecutively. This enhances motion perception to the viewer, and reduces flicker by taking advantage of the characteristics of the human visual system.

This effectively doubles the time resolution (also called temporal resolution) as compared to non-interlaced footage (for frame rates equal to field rates). Interlaced signals require a display that is natively capable of showing the individual fields in a sequential order. CRT displays and ALiS plasma displays are made for displaying interlaced signals.

Interlaced scan refers to one of two common methods for "painting" a video image on an electronic display screen (the other being progressive scan) by scanning or displaying each line or row of pixels. This technique uses two fields to create a frame. One field contains all odd-numbered lines in the image; the other contains all even-numbered lines.

Sometimes in interlaced video a field is called a frame which can lead to confusion.

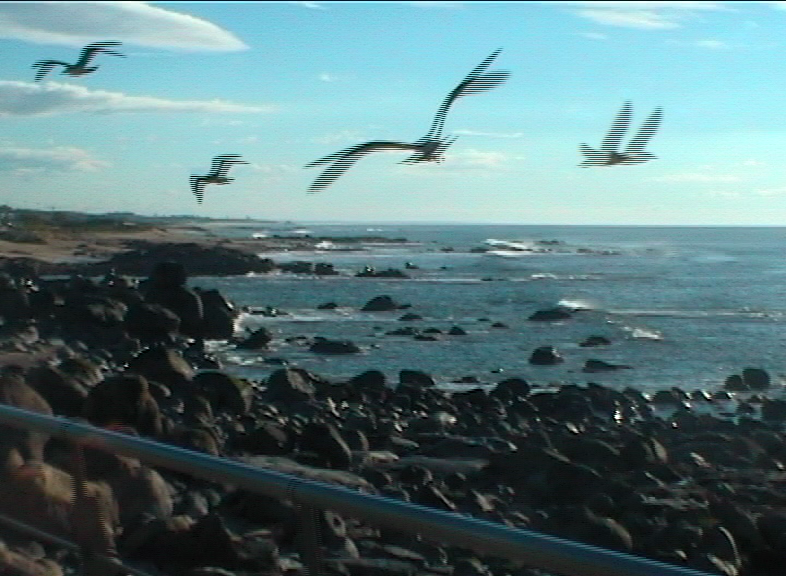
Interlacing artifacts. Note the lines protruding outwards from objects in motion due to the frames not lining up along the x-axis.

A Phase Alternating Line (PAL)-based television set display, for example, scans 50 fields every second (25 odd and 25 even). The two sets of 25 fields work together to create a full frame every 1/25 of a second (or 25 frames per second), but with interlacing create a new half frame every 1/50 of a second (or 50 fields per second). To display interlaced video on progressive scan displays, playback applies deinterlacing to the video signal (which adds input lag).

The European Broadcasting Union argued against interlaced video in production and broadcasting. Until the early 2010s, they recommended 720p 50 fps (frames per second) for the current production format—and were working with the industry to introduce 1080p 50 as a future-proof production standard. 1080p 50 offers higher vertical resolution, better quality at lower bitrates, and easier conversion to other formats, such as 720p 50 and 1080i 50. The main argument is that no matter how complex the deinterlacing algorithm may be, the artifacts in the interlaced signal cannot be eliminated because some information is lost between frames.

Despite arguments against it, television standards organizations continue to support interlacing. It is still included in digital video transmission formats such as DV, DVB, and ATSC. New video compression standards like High Efficiency Video Coding are optimized for progressive scan video, but sometimes do support interlaced video.

== Description ==
Interlaced scanning: display of odd (green) and even (red) scanlines, and line return blanking periods (dotted)

Progressive scan captures, transmits, and displays an image line by line, from top to bottom. In a standard definition CRT display, interlaced scanning completes the image in two passes known as fields. One pass scans the odd-numbered lines from top to bottom, while the other scans the even numbered lines, filling the gaps between them as it scans.

This scanning of alternate lines is called interlacing. A field is an image that contains only half of the lines needed to make a complete picture. In CRT displays, the afterglow of the display's phosphor aided this effect.

Interlacing provides full vertical detail with the same bandwidth that would be required for a full progressive scan, but with twice the perceived refresh rate. To prevent flicker, analog broadcast television systems widely used interlacing.

Format identifiers like 576i50 and 720p50 specify the frame rate for progressive scan formats, but for interlaced formats they typically specify the field rate (which is twice the frame rate). This can lead to confusion, because industry-standard SMPTE timecode formats deal with frame rate rather than field rate. To avoid confusion, SMPTE and EBU use frame rate to specify interlaced formats, e.g., 480i60 is 480i/30, 576i50 is 576i/25, and 1080i50 is 1080i/25. This convention assumes that one complete frame in an interlaced signal consists of two fields in sequence.

== Benefits of interlacing ==
A GIF from HandBrake, demonstrating the difference between deinterlaced and interlaced images

One of the most important factors in analog television is signal bandwidth, measured in megahertz. The greater the bandwidth, the more expensive and complex the entire production and broadcasting chain. This includes cameras, storage systems, broadcast systems—and reception systems: terrestrial, cable, satellite, Internet, and end-user displays (TVs and computer monitors).

For a fixed bandwidth, interlace provides a video signal with twice the display refresh rate for a given line count (versus progressive scan video at a similar frame rate—for instance 1080i at 60 half-frames per second, vs. 1080p at 30 full frames per second). The higher refresh rate improves the appearance of an object in motion, because it updates its position on the display more often, and when an object is stationary, human vision combines information from multiple similar half-frames to produce the same perceived resolution as that provided by a progressive full frame. This technique is only useful, though, if source material is available in higher refresh rates. Cinema movies are typically recorded at 24fps, and therefore do not benefit from interlacing, a solution which reduces the maximum video bandwidth to 5 MHz without reducing the effective picture scan rate of 60 Hz.

Given a fixed bandwidth and high refresh rate, interlaced video can also provide a higher spatial resolution than progressive scan. For instance, 1920×1080 pixel resolution interlaced HDTV with a 60 Hz field rate (known as 1080i60 or 1080i/30) has a similar bandwidth to 1280×720 pixel progressive scan HDTV with a 60 Hz frame rate (720p60 or 720p/60), but achieves approximately twice the spatial resolution for low-motion scenes.

However, bandwidth benefits only apply to an analog or uncompressed digital video signal. With digital video compression, as used in all current digital TV standards, interlacing introduces additional inefficiencies. EBU has performed tests that show that the bandwidth savings of interlaced video over progressive video is minimal, even with twice the frame rate. I.e., 1080p50 signal produces roughly the same bit rate as 1080i50 (aka 1080i/25) signal, and 1080p50 actually requires less bandwidth to be perceived as subjectively better than its 1080i/25 (1080i50) equivalent when encoding a "sports-type" scene.

Interlacing can be exploited to produce 3D TV programming, especially with a CRT display and especially for color filtered glasses by transmitting the color keyed picture for each eye in the alternating fields. This does not require significant alterations to existing equipment. Shutter glasses can be adopted as well, obviously with the requirement of achieving synchronisation. If a progressive scan display is used to view such programming, any attempt to deinterlace the picture will render the effect useless. For color filtered glasses the picture has to be either buffered and shown as if it was progressive with alternating color keyed lines, or each field has to be line-doubled and displayed as discrete frames. The latter procedure is the only way to suit shutter glasses on a progressive display.

== Interlacing problems ==
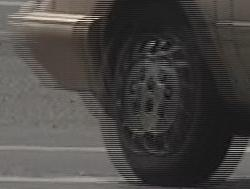
When someone watches interlaced video on a progressive monitor with poor (or no) deinterlacing, they can see "combing" in movement between two fields of one frame.

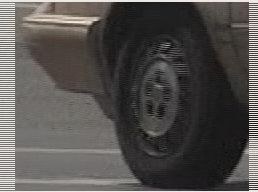
Picture of a moving car tire, interlace combing reduced by realigning the even and odd field on the X axis. The other field has been moved 16 pixels right, reducing the combing on the bumper and the tire outline, but the hub cap that has turned between the fields has notable combing.

Interlaced video is designed to be captured, stored, transmitted, and displayed in the same interlaced format. Because each interlaced video frame is two fields captured at different moments in time, interlaced video frames can exhibit motion artifacts known as interlacing effects, or combing, if recorded objects move fast enough to be in different positions when each individual field is captured. These artifacts may be more visible when interlaced video is displayed at a slower speed than it was captured, or in still frames.

While there are simple methods to produce somewhat satisfactory progressive frames from the interlaced image, for example by doubling the lines of one field and omitting the other (halving vertical resolution), or anti-aliasing the image in the vertical axis to hide some of the combing, there are sometimes methods of producing results far superior to these. If there is only sideways (X axis) motion between the two fields and this motion is even throughout the full frame, it is possible to align the scanlines and crop the left and right ends that exceed the frame area to produce a visually satisfactory image. Minor Y axis motion can be corrected similarly by aligning the scanlines in a different sequence and cropping the excess at the top and bottom. Often the middle of the picture is the most necessary area to put into check, and whether there is only X or Y axis alignment correction, or both are applied, most artifacts will occur towards the edges of the picture. However, even these simple procedures require motion tracking between the fields, and a rotating or tilting object, or one that moves in the Z axis (away from or towards the camera) will still produce combing, possibly even looking worse than if the fields were joined in a simpler method. Some deinterlacing processes can analyze each frame individually and decide the best method. The best and only perfect conversion in these cases is to treat each frame as a separate image, but that may not always be possible. For framerate conversions and zooming it would mostly be ideal to line-double each field to produce a double rate of progressive frames, resample the frames to the desired resolution and then re-scan the stream at the desired rate, either in progressive or interlaced mode.

=== Interline twitter ===
Interlace introduces a potential problem called interline twitter, a form of moiré. This aliasing effect only shows up under certain circumstances—when the subject contains vertical detail that approaches the horizontal resolution of the video format. For instance, a finely striped jacket on a news anchor may produce a shimmering effect. This is twittering. Television professionals avoid wearing clothing with fine striped patterns for this reason. Professional video cameras or computer-generated imagery systems apply a low-pass filter to the vertical resolution of the signal to prevent interline twitter.

Interline twitter is the primary reason that interlacing is less suited for computer displays. Each scanline on a high-resolution computer monitor typically displays discrete pixels, each of which does not span the scanline above or below. When the overall interlaced framerate is 60 frames per second, a pixel (or more critically for e.g. windowing systems or underlined text, a horizontal line) that spans only one scanline in height is visible for the 1/60 of a second that would be expected of a 60 Hz progressive display - but is then followed by 1/60 of a second of darkness (whilst the opposite field is scanned), reducing the per-line/per-pixel refresh rate to 30 frames per second with quite obvious flicker.

To avoid this, standard interlaced television sets typically do not display sharp detail. When computer graphics appear on a standard television set, the screen is either treated as if it were half the resolution of what it actually is (or even lower), or rendered at full resolution and then subjected to a low-pass filter in the vertical direction (e.g. a "motion blur" type with a 1-pixel distance, which blends each line 50% with the next, maintaining a degree of the full positional resolution and preventing the obvious "blockiness" of simple line doubling whilst actually reducing flicker to less than what the simpler approach would achieve). If text is displayed, it is large enough so that any horizontal lines are at least two scanlines high. Most fonts for television programming have wide, fat strokes, and do not include fine-detail serifs that would make the twittering more visible; in addition, modern character generators apply a degree of anti-aliasing that has a similar line-spanning effect to the aforementioned full-frame low-pass filter.

Interlacing example (Note: high rate of flickering)

Note – Because the frame rate has been slowed by a factor of 3, one notices additional flicker in simulated interlaced portions of this image.

This animation demonstrates the interline twitter effect using the Indian Head test card. On the left are two progressive scan images. Center are two interlaced images. Right are two images with line doublers. Top are original resolution, bottom are with anti-aliasing. The two interlaced images use half the bandwidth of the progressive one. The interlaced scan (center) precisely duplicates the pixels of the progressive image (left), but interlace causes details to twitter. A line doubler operating in "bob" (interpolation) mode would produce the images at far right. Real interlaced video blurs such details to prevent twitter, as seen in the bottom row, but such softening (or anti-aliasing) comes at the cost of image clarity. But even the best line doubler could never restore the bottom center image to the full resolution of the progressive image.

== Deinterlacing ==
ALiS plasma panels and CRTs can display interlaced video directly, but modern computer video displays and TV sets are mostly based on LCD technology, which mostly use progressive scanning.

Displaying interlaced video on a progressive scan display requires a process called deinterlacing. This can be an imperfect technique, especially if the frame rate isn't doubled in the deinterlaced output. Providing the best picture quality for interlaced video signals without doubling the frame rate requires expensive and complex devices and algorithms, and can cause various artifacts. For television displays, deinterlacing systems are integrated into progressive scan TV sets that accept interlaced signal, such as broadcast SDTV signal.

Most modern computer monitors do not support interlaced video, besides some legacy medium-resolution modes (and possibly 1080i as an adjunct to 1080p), and support for standard-definition video (480/576i or 240/288p) is particularly rare given its much lower line-scanning frequency vs typical "VGA"-or-higher analog computer video modes. Playing back interlaced video from a DVD, digital file or analog capture card on a computer display instead requires some form of deinterlacing in the player software and/or graphics hardware, which often uses very simple methods to deinterlace. This means that interlaced video often has visible artifacts on computer systems. Computer systems may be used to edit interlaced video, but the disparity between computer video display systems and interlaced television signal formats means that the video content being edited cannot be viewed properly without separate video display hardware.

Current manufacture TV sets employ a system of intelligently extrapolating the extra information that would be present in a progressive signal entirely from an interlaced original. In theory: this should simply be a problem of applying the appropriate algorithms to the interlaced signal, as all information should be present in that signal. In practice, results are currently variable, and depend on the quality of the input signal and amount of processing power applied to the conversion. The biggest impediment, at present, is artifacts in the lower quality interlaced signals (generally broadcast video), as these are not consistent from field to field. On the other hand, high bit rate interlaced signals such as from HD camcorders operating in their highest bit rate mode work well.

Deinterlacing algorithms temporarily store a few frames of interlaced images and then extrapolate extra frame data to make a smooth flicker-free image. This frame storage and processing results in a slight display lag that is visible in business showrooms with a large number of different models on display. Unlike the old unprocessed NTSC signal, the screens do not all follow motion in perfect synchrony. Some models appear to update slightly faster or slower than others. Similarly, the audio can have an echo effect due to different processing delays.

== History ==
When motion picture film was developed, the movie screen had to be illuminated at a high rate to prevent visible flicker. The exact rate necessary varies by brightness — 50 Hz is (barely) acceptable for small, low brightness displays in dimly lit rooms, whilst 80 Hz or more may be necessary for bright displays that extend into peripheral vision. The film solution was to project each frame of film three times using a three-bladed shutter: a movie shot at 16 frames per second illuminated the screen 48 times per second. Later, when sound film became available, the higher projection speed of 24 frames per second enabled a two-bladed shutter to produce 48 times per second illumination—but only in projectors incapable of projecting at the lower speed.

This solution could not be used for television. To store a full video frame and display it twice requires a frame buffer—electronic memory (RAM)—sufficient to store a video frame. This method did not become feasible until the late 1980s and with digital technology. In addition, avoiding on-screen interference patterns caused by studio lighting and the limits of vacuum tube technology required that CRTs for TV be scanned at AC line frequency. (This was 60 Hz in the US, 50 Hz Europe.)

Several different interlacing patents have been proposed since 1914 in the context of still or moving image transmission, but few of them were practicable. In 1926, Ulises Armand Sanabria demonstrated television to 200,000 people attending Chicago Radio World's Fair. Sanabria's system was mechanically scanned using a 'triple interlace' Nipkow disc with three offset spirals and was thus a 3:1 scheme rather than the usual 2:1. It worked with 45 line 15 frames per second images being transmitted. With 15 frames per second and a 3:1 interlace the field rate was 45 fields per second yielding (for the time) a very steady image. He did not apply for a patent for his interlaced scanning until May 1931.

In 1930, German Telefunken engineer Fritz Schröter first formulated and patented the concept of breaking a single image frame into successive interlaced lines, based on his earlier experiments with phototelegraphy. In the US, RCA engineer Randall C. Ballard patented the same idea in 1932, initially for the purpose of reformatting sound film to television rather than for the transmission of live images. Commercial implementation began in 1934 as cathode-ray tube screens became brighter, increasing the level of flicker caused by progressive (sequential) scanning.

In 1936, when the UK was setting analog standards, early thermionic valve based CRT drive electronics could only scan at around 200 lines in 1/50 of a second (i.e. approximately a 10 kHz repetition rate for the sawtooth horizontal deflection waveform). Using interlace, a pair of 202.5-line fields could be superimposed to become a sharper 405 line frame (with around 377 used for the actual image, and yet fewer visible within the screen bezel; in modern parlance, the standard would be "377i"). The vertical scan frequency remained 50 Hz, but visible detail was noticeably improved. As a result, this system supplanted John Logie Baird's 240 line mechanical progressive scan system that was also being trialled at the time.

From the 1940s onward, improvements in technology allowed the US and the rest of Europe to adopt systems using increasingly higher line-scan frequencies and more radio signal bandwidth to produce higher line counts at the same frame rate, thus achieving better picture quality. However the fundamentals of interlaced scanning were at the heart of all of these systems. The US adopted the 525 line system, later incorporating the composite color standard known as NTSC, Europe adopted the 625 line system, and the UK switched from its idiosyncratic 405 line system to (the much more US-like) 625 to avoid having to develop a (wholly) unique method of color TV. France switched from its similarly unique 819 line monochrome system to the more European standard of 625. Europe in general, including the UK, then adopted the PAL color encoding standard, which was essentially based on NTSC, but inverted the color carrier phase with each line (and frame) in order to cancel out the hue-distorting phase shifts that dogged NTSC broadcasts. France instead adopted its own unique, twin-FM-carrier based SECAM system, which offered improved quality at the cost of greater electronic complexity, and was also used by some other countries, notably Russia and its satellite states. Though the color standards are often used as synonyms for the underlying video standard - NTSC for 525i/60, PAL/SECAM for 625i/50 - there are several cases of inversions or other modifications; e.g. PAL color is used on otherwise "NTSC" (that is, 525i/60) broadcasts in Brazil, as well as vice versa elsewhere, along with cases of PAL bandwidth being squeezed to 3.58 MHz to fit in the broadcast waveband allocation of NTSC, or NTSC being expanded to take up PAL's 4.43 MHz.

Interlacing was ubiquitous in displays until the 1970s, when the needs of computer monitors resulted in the reintroduction of progressive scan, including on regular TVs or simple monitors based on the same circuitry; most CRT based displays are entirely capable of displaying both progressive and interlace regardless of their original intended use, so long as the horizontal and vertical frequencies match, as the technical difference is simply that of either starting/ending the vertical sync cycle halfway along a scanline every other frame (interlace), or always synchronising right at the start/end of a line (progressive). Interlace is still used for most standard definition TVs, and the 1080i HDTV broadcast standard, but not for LCD, micromirror (DLP), or most plasma displays; these displays do not use a raster scan to create an image (their panels may still be updated in a left-to-right, top-to-bottom scanning fashion, but always in a progressive fashion, and not necessarily at the same rate as the input signal), and so cannot benefit from interlacing (where older LCDs use a "dual scan" system to provide higher resolution with slower-updating technology, the panel is instead divided into two adjacent halves that are updated simultaneously): in practice, they have to be driven with a progressive scan signal. The deinterlacing circuitry to get progressive scan from a normal interlaced broadcast television signal can add to the cost of a television set using such displays. Currently, progressive displays dominate the HDTV market.

=== Interlace and computers ===
In the 1970s, computers and home video game systems began using TV sets as display devices. At that point, a 480-line NTSC signal was well beyond the graphics abilities of low cost computers, so these systems used a simplified video signal that made each video field scan directly on top of the previous one, rather than each line between two lines of the previous field, along with relatively low horizontal pixel counts. This marked the return of progressive scanning not seen since the 1920s. Since each field became a complete frame on its own, modern terminology would call this 240p on NTSC sets, and 288p on PAL. While consumer devices were permitted to create such signals, broadcast regulations prohibited TV stations from transmitting video like this. Computer monitor standards such as the TTL-RGB mode available on the CGA and e.g. BBC Micro were further simplifications to NTSC, which improved picture quality by omitting modulation of color, and allowing a more direct connection between the computer's graphics system and the CRT.

By the mid-1980s, computers had outgrown these video systems and needed better displays. Most home and basic office computers suffered from the use of the old scanning method, with the highest display resolution being around 640x200 (or sometimes 640x256 in 625-line/50 Hz regions), resulting in a severely distorted tall narrow pixel shape, making the display of high resolution text alongside realistic proportioned images difficult (logical "square pixel" modes were possible but only at low resolutions of 320x200 or less). Solutions from various companies varied widely. Because PC monitor signals did not need to be broadcast, they could consume far more than the 6, 7 and 8 MHz of bandwidth that NTSC and PAL signals were confined to. IBM's Monochrome Display Adapter and Enhanced Graphics Adapter as well as the Hercules Graphics Card and the original Macintosh computer generated video signals of 342 to 350p, at 50 to 60 Hz, with approximately 16 MHz of bandwidth, some enhanced PC clones such as the AT&T 6300 (aka Olivetti M24) as well as computers made for the Japanese home market managed 480p instead at around 24 MHz, and the Atari ST pushed that to 71 Hz with 32 MHz bandwidth - all of which required dedicated high-frequency (and usually single-mode, i.e. not "video"-compatible) monitors due to their increased line rates. The Commodore Amiga instead created a true interlaced 480i60/576i50 RGB signal at broadcast video rates (and with a 7 or 14 MHz bandwidth), suitable for NTSC/PAL encoding (where it was smoothly decimated to 3.5~4.5 MHz). This ability (plus built-in genlocking) resulted in the Amiga dominating the video production field until the mid-1990s, but the interlaced display mode caused flicker problems for more traditional PC applications where single-pixel detail is required, with "flicker-fixer" scan-doubler peripherals plus high-frequency RGB monitors (or Commodore's own specialist scan-conversion A2024 monitor) being popular, if expensive, purchases amongst power users. 1987 saw the introduction of VGA, on which PCs soon standardized, as well as Apple's Macintosh II range which offered displays of similar, then superior resolution and color depth, with rivalry between the two standards (and later PC quasi-standards such as XGA and SVGA) rapidly pushing up the quality of display available to both professional and home users.

In the late 1980s and early 1990s, monitor and graphics card manufacturers introduced newer high resolution standards that once again included interlace. These monitors ran at higher scanning frequencies, typically allowing a 75 to 90 Hz field rate (i.e. 37.5 to 45 Hz frame rate), and tended to use longer-persistence phosphors in their CRTs, all of which was intended to alleviate flicker and shimmer problems. Such monitors proved generally unpopular, outside of specialist ultra-high-resolution applications such as CAD and DTP which demanded as many pixels as possible, with interlace being a necessary evil and better than trying to use the progressive-scan equivalents. Whilst flicker was often not immediately obvious on these displays, eyestrain and lack of focus nevertheless became a serious problem, and the trade-off for a longer afterglow was reduced brightness and poor response to moving images, leaving visible and often off-colored trails behind. These colored trails were a minor annoyance for monochrome displays, and the generally slower-updating screens used for design or database-query purposes, but much more troublesome for color displays and the faster motions inherent in the increasingly popular window-based operating systems, as well as the full-screen scrolling in WYSIWYG word-processors, spreadsheets, and of course for high-action games. Additionally, the regular, thin horizontal lines common to early GUIs, combined with low color depth that meant window elements were generally high-contrast (indeed, frequently stark black-and-white), made shimmer even more obvious than with otherwise lower fieldrate video applications. As rapid technological advancement made it practical and affordable, barely a decade after the first ultra-high-resolution interlaced upgrades appeared for the IBM PC, to provide sufficiently high pixel clocks and horizontal scan rates for hi-rez progressive-scan modes in first professional and then consumer-grade displays, the practice was soon abandoned. For the rest of the 1990s, monitors and graphics cards instead made great play of their highest stated resolutions being "non-interlaced", even where the overall framerate was barely any higher than what it had been for the interlaced modes (e.g. SVGA at 56p versus 43i to 47i), and usually including a top mode technically exceeding the CRT's actual resolution (number of color-phosphor triads) which meant there was no additional image clarity to be gained through interlacing and/or increasing the signal bandwidth still further. This experience is why the PC industry today remains against interlace in HDTV, and lobbied for the 720p standard, and continues to push for the adoption of 1080p (at 60 Hz for NTSC legacy countries, and 50 Hz for PAL); however, 1080i remains the most common HD broadcast resolution, if only for reasons of backward compatibility with older HDTV hardware that cannot support 1080p - and sometimes not even 720p - without the addition of an external scaler, similar to how and why most SD-focussed digital broadcasting still relies on the otherwise obsolete MPEG2 standard embedded into e.g. DVB-T.

== See also ==
- 1080i: high-definition television (HDTV) digitally broadcast in 16:9 (widescreen) aspect ratio standard
- 480i: standard-definition interlaced video usually used in traditionally NTSC countries (North America, parts of South America, Japan)
- 576i: standard-definition interlaced video usually used in traditionally PAL and SECAM countries
- Deinterlacing: converting an interlaced video signal into a non-interlaced one
- Field (video): In interlaced video, one of the many still images displayed sequentially to create the illusion of motion on the screen.
- Federal Standard 1037C: defines interlaced scanning
- Progressive scan: the opposite of interlacing; the image is displayed line by line.
- Progressive segmented frame: a scheme designed to acquire, store, modify, and distribute progressive-scan video using interlaced equipment and media
- Telecine: a method for converting film frame rates to television frame rates using interlacing
- Screen tearing
- Wobulation: a variation of interlacing used in DLP displays
