= Alternate lighting of surfaces =

Display screen technology

Alternate lighting of surfaces (ALiS) is type of plasma display technology jointly developed by Fujitsu and Hitachi in 1999. Alternate lighting of surfaces uses an interlaced scanning method rather than a progressive one. This technique allows native lower resolution plasma display panels to display at higher resolutions. This technique also helps in prolonging panel life and power consumption reductions.
