= Response time (technology) =

Time a given technological system takes to respond to an input

In technology, response time is the time a system or functional unit takes to react to a given input.

== Computing ==
In computing, the responsiveness of a service, how long a system takes to respond to a request for service, is measured through the response time. That service can be anything from a memory fetch, to a disk IO, to a complex database query, or loading a full web page. Ignoring transmission time for a moment, the response time is the sum of the service time and wait time. The service time is the time it takes to do the work you requested. For a given request the service time varies little as the workload increases – to do X amount of work it always takes X amount of time. The wait time is how long the request had to wait in a queue before being serviced and it varies from zero, when no waiting is required, to a large multiple of the service time, as many requests are already in the queue and have to be serviced first.

With basic queueing theory math you can calculate how the average wait time increases as the device providing the service goes from 0-100% busy. As the device becomes busier, the average wait time increases in a non-linear fashion. The busier the device is, the more dramatic the response time increases will seem as you approach 100% busy; all of that increase is caused by increases in wait time, which is the result of all the requests waiting in queue that have to run first.

Transmission time gets added to response time when your request and the resulting response has to travel over a network and it can be very significant. Transmission time can include propagation delays due to distance (the speed of light is finite), delays due to transmission errors, and data communication bandwidth limits (especially at the last mile) slowing the transmission speed of the request or the reply.

Developers can reduce the response time of a system (for end users or not) using program optimization techniques.

== Real-time systems ==
In real-time systems the response time of a task or thread is defined as the time elapsed between the dispatch (time when task is ready to execute) to the time when it finishes its job (one dispatch). Response time is different from WCET which is the maximum time the task would take if it were to execute without interference. It is also different from deadline which is the length of time during which the task's output would be valid in the context of the specific system. And it has a relation to the TTFB, which is the time between the dispatch and the time when the response starts.

== Display technologies ==
Response time is the amount of time a pixel in a display takes to change. It is measured in milliseconds (ms). Lower numbers mean faster transitions and therefore fewer visible image artifacts. Display monitors with long response times would create display motion blur around moving objects, making them unacceptable for rapidly moving images. Response times are usually measured from grey-to-grey transitions, based on a VESA industry standard from the 10% to the 90% points in the pixel response curve.

In fast paced competitive games such as Counter-Strike, the response time of a display is crucial for optimal performance. Displays that have a lower response time are more responsive to player input and produce less visual errors when displaying a rapidly changing image, making low response time important for competitive gaming. Most modern monitors that are marketed for gaming have a response time of 1ms, although it is not uncommon to see <1ms response time in high end monitors, and >1ms response time on less expensive monitors or monitors that have a higher resolution.

== See also ==
- Latency (engineering)
- Interrupt latency
- Application Response Measurement
