= Balochi cinema =

- No. of screens: 18 (2023)
- Main distributors: Various local distributors

Balochi cinema refers to the Balochi-language film industry in Pakistan, Iran, and among the Baloch diaspora.

== History ==
The first Balochi feature film, Hammal O Mahganj(Hammal Jiand), was produced by Anwar Iqbal and released in Pakistan in 1976. However, the film never made it to the screen amidst protests by cultural activists who alleged it misrepresented Baloch culture. A slogan used by the protest movement was "Balochi film chalay ga tou cinema jalay ga" (If Balochi films are screened, cinemas will be burnt). Analysts believe the film's release became politicised, as PPP activists favoured the film while Baloch nationalist groups opposed it. Iqbal later arranged a private screening of the film to address the reservations, where Sindh's labour minister-cum-PPP leader Abdullah Baloch was a key attendee. According to The News, those who viewed it "agreed that the film did not have anything that went against the Baloch culture". The declining quality of erstwhile Punjabi and Pashto cinema reportedly contributed to the Baloch activists' sentiments. This is believed to have dented the Balochi film industry's initial growth.

In 1989, the Iranian film Dadshah was released in Balochi dubbing. The film was based on Mir Dad Shah of Iranian Balochistan. In the subsequent years, cinema growth in Balochistan remained slow in line with the stagnant growth of Pakistan's film industry. An uncertain security situation further led to nearly half of Quetta's cinema houses facing closure by 2010. The availability of films via Blu-rays, DVDs, VCRs and cable networks has also hampered the cinema-going trend.

== Re-emergence ==
"Imagine the premieres of local films taking place in Quetta and celebrities coming to the red carpet."

— Ayub Khoso (2016) on the opening of Weplex 3D multiplex in Quetta, hosting Pakistan's largest curved screen.

In recent years, a younger generation of Baloch filmmakers has emerged in Balochistan and Karachi, as part of the new wave of Pakistani cinema. This phase has witnessed the production of quality short films as well as documentaries focusing on social and political issues, such as Ich Gushgi Nahe (Keep Silent) in 2007. In 2013, The Line of Freedom, a short film based on Balochistan's human rights situation, was produced by Noordin Mengal, Bhawal Mengal and David Whitney, starring British and Baloch actors. In 2014, the Lyari Film Festival was held in Karachi's Lyari neighbourhood, which is famous for its Baloch community. Several Balochi short films were screened at the event. The Nosach Films Academy, which organised the event, provides support to Balochi filmmakers in Lyari.

In 2016, Ahsan Shah's Jaawar (Ongoing Situation), which focuses on the Lyari gang war, won the first prize at Bahrain's International Youth Creativity Awards. The same year, Sawaad (Ocean) was screened at the Lok Virsa Museum in Islamabad. An upcoming filmmaker is Haneef Shareef, who has directed popular hits such as Balaach, Manzil, Mani Pethaa Braath Nesth and Kareem from 2009 to 2014. Other recent Balochi films include Jageen, Ganjen Gwadar, Rahdarbar, Aadenk, Zoorak, Betach, Drandeh, Karwaan, Hankain, Maath, Bemuraad, Begowaah, Pendok 2, Yaghi and Showanag.

Balochistan has served as a filming location or subject of portrayal in multiple Urdu films, television serials and documentaries. There have also been foreign documentaries made on the region. As of 2002, there were 8 main theatres in Quetta and a few in Makran, Sibi, Kalat and Zhob. Quetta's 3D Weplex Pak Force Cinema, opened in 2016, currently features the largest curved screen in Pakistan. Other popular single-screen cinemas in the city are Paradise, Imdad and Delight.

In Iran, Balochi theatre is in its infancy stage and is concentrated mainly in Zahedan, Iranshahr, and Khash. As of 2008, Zahedan-based Honorkadeh Saba was the sole cultural institution promoting Balochi cinema and theatre.

Sangat by Sami Sarang was Pakistan's first Balochi film released after decades in August 2017. In 2018 Zaraab (Heat Haze) by Dj Jaan Al Balushi won several awards. In 2020 the movie Doda was released in Karachi Art Festival.

== See also ==
- List of Balochi-language television channels
- Balochi music
- Cinema of Pakistan
