= Ultrawide formats =

Photo and video display formats

Comparison of common display resolutions

Ultrawide formats refers to photos, videos, and displays with aspect ratios greater than 2. There were multiple moves in history towards wider formats, including one by Disney, with some of them being more successful than others.

Cameras usually capture ultra-wide photos and videos using an anamorphic format lens, which shrinks the extended horizontal field-of-view (FOV) while saving on film or disk.

== Historic Ultrawide Cinema ==
Historically ultrawide movie formats have varied between ~2.35 (1678:715), ~2.39 (1024:429) and 2.4. To complicate matters further, films were also produced in ratios of 2.55, 2.76 and even 4.00. Developed by Rowe E. Carney Jr. and Tom F. Smith, the Smith-Carney System used a 3-camera system add 4.69̅4̅5̅ (1737:370) ratio to project movies in 180°. Disney even created a 6.85 ratio, using 5 projectors to display 200°; the only movie ever filmed in this ratio is Impressions de France.

== Wide aspect ratios ==
Suggested by Kerns H. Powers of SMPTE in USA, the 16:9 aspect ratio was developed to unify all other aspect ratios. Subsequently it became the universal standard for widescreen and high-definition television.

Around 2007, cameras and non-television screens began to switch from 15:9 (5:3) and 16:10 (8:5) to 16:9 resolutions.

== Extra-wide aspect ratios ==
Univisium is an aspect ratio of 2:1, created by Vittorio Storaro of the American Society of Cinematographers (ASC) originally intended to unify all other aspect ratios used in movies.

It is popular on smartphones and cheap VR displays. VR displays halve the screen into two, one for each eye. So a 2:1 VR screen would be halved into two 1:1 screens. Smartphones began moving to this aspect ratio since the late 2010s with the release of the Samsung Galaxy S8, advertised as 18:9.

== Ultra-wide aspect ratios ==
A curved computer monitor with an ultrawide aspect ratio.

21:9 is a consumer electronics (CE) marketing term to describe the ultra-widescreen aspect ratio of 64:27 (21 1/3 : 9) = 1024:432 for multiples of 1080 lines. It is used for multiple anamorphic formats and DCI 1024:429 (21.4̅8̅2̅5̅1̅7̅:9), but also for ultrawide computer monitorss, including 43:18 (21 1/2:9) for resolutions based on 720 lines and 12:5 (21 3/5:9) for ultrawide variants of resolutions based either on 960 pixels width or 900 lines height.

The 64:27 aspect ratio is the logical extension of the existing video aspect ratios 4:3 and 16:9. It is the third power of 4:3, whereas 16:9 of widescreen HDTV is 4:3 squared. This allows electronic scalers and optical anamorphic lenses to use an easily implementable 4:3 (1.33̅) scaling factor.

$\tfrac{4}{3} \cdot \tfrac{4}{3} \cdot \tfrac{4}{3} = \tfrac{64}{27}$

21:9 movies usually refers to 1024:429 ≈ 2.387, the aspect ratio of digital ultrawide cinema formats, which is often rounded up to 2.39:1 or 2.4:1

Ultrawide resolution can also be described by its height, such as "UW 1080" and "1080p ultrawide" both stands for the same 2560×1080 resolution.

Ultra-wide (UW) resolutions
common name	aspect ratio	resolution
WFHD	64∶27	2560×1080
WFHD+	12∶5	2880×1200
WQHD	43∶18	3440×1440
WQHD+	12∶5	3840×1600
UW4K	12∶5	4320×1800
UW5K (WUHD)	64∶27	5120×2160
SUHD	8∶3	5760×2160
UW5K+	12∶5	5760×2400
UW6K	12∶5	6144×2560
UW6K+	43∶18	6880×2880
UW7K	12∶5	7680×3200
UW8K	12∶5	8640×3600
UW10K	64∶27	10240×4320

Ultra-wide (UW) aspect ratios
decimal	simple	n∶9
2.3̅7̅0̅	64∶27	21 1/3∶9
2.38̅	43∶18	21 1/2∶9
2.4	12∶5	21 3/5∶9
2.6̅	8∶3	24∶9

== Super ultra-wide aspect ratios ==
In 2016, IMAX announced the release of films in Ultra-WideScreen 3.6 format, with an aspect ratio of 18:5 (36:10). A year later, Samsung and Phillips announced 'super ultra-wide displays', with aspect ratio of 32:9, for "iMax-style cinematic viewing". Panacast developed a 32:9 webcam with three integrated cameras giving 180° view, and resolution matching upcoming 5K 32:9 monitors, 5120x1440. In 2018 Q4, Dell released the U4919DW, a 5K 32:9 monitor with a resolution of 5120x1440, and Phillips announced the 499P9H with the same resolution. 32:9 Ultrawide monitors are often sold as an alternative to dual 16:9 monitor setups and for more inmersive experiences while playing videogames, and many are capable of displaying 2 16:9 inputs at the same time.

32:9 aspect ratio is derived from 16:9 being twice as large. Some manufacturers therefore refer to the resulting total display resolution with a D prefix for dual or double.

Super wide resolutions refers to that with aspect ratio greater than 3.

Super-wide (SW) resolutions
common name	aspect ratio	resolution
DWXGA+	16∶5	2880×900
DFHD	32∶9	3840×1080
DFHD+	16∶5	3840×1200
SWFHD+	18∶5	4320×1200
DQHD	32∶9	5120×1440
DQHD+	16∶5	5120×1600
SWQHD+	18∶5	5760×1600
16:5 5K	16∶5	5760×1800
32:9 6K	32∶9	6400×1800
18:5 6K	18∶5	6480×1800
DUHD	32∶9	7680×2160
DUHD+	16∶5	7680×2400
18:5 8K	18∶5	8640×2400

Super-wide (SW) aspect ratios
decimal	simple	n:9
3.2	16∶5	28 4/5∶9
3.5̅	32∶9	32∶9
3.6	18∶5	32 2/5∶9

Ultra-WideScreen 3.6 video never spread, as cinemas in an even wider ScreenX 270° format were released.

== 4:1 (36:9) ==
Abel Gance experimented with ultrawide formats including making a film in 4:1 (36:9). He made a rare use of Polyvision, three 35 mm 1.3̅ images projected side by side in the 1927 film Napoléon.

AT NAB 2019, Sony introduced a 19.2-metre-wide by 5.4-metre-tall commercial 16K display. It is made up of 576 modules (48 by 12) each 360 pixels across, resulting in a 4:1, 17280x4320p screen.

== Multi-Screen Theaters ==
Developed by CJ CGV in 2012, ScreenX uses three (or more) projectors to display 270° content, with an unknown aspect ratio above 4. Walls on both sides of a ScreenX theatre are used as projector screens.

Developed by Barco N.V. in 2015, Barco Escape used three projectors of 2.39 ratio to display 270° content, with an aspect ratio of 7.17. The two side screens were angled at 45 degree in order to cover peripheral vision. Barco Escape shut down in February 2018.

== Comparison ==
Decimal value	Aspect ratio	Format name	Resolutions	Lens & Film
0.4̅2̅8̅5̅7̅1̅	3:7	7:3 portrait format	720×1680, 864×2016, 1080×2520, 1200×2800, 1440×3360, 1644×3840	phones, monitors in vertical mode
0.4̅3̅9̅0̅2̅	18:41	9:20.5 vertical format	720×1640, 1080×2460, 1440×3280	some phones
0.45	9:20	9:20 portrait format	720×1600, 900×2000, 1080×2400, 1200×2664, 1440×3200	phones
0.4̅6̅1̅5̅3̅8̅	6:13	6:13 portrait format	720×1560, 1080×2340, 1440×3120	phone
0.4̅7̅3̅6̅8̅	9:19	9:19 portrait format	720×1520, 1080×2280, 1440×3040	phone
0.4̅8̅6̅	18:37	18:37 portrait format	720×1480, 1080×2220, 1440×2960	phones
0.5	1:2	portrait 1:2 format	720×1440, 1080×2160, 1440×2880	phone
0.5625	9:16	portrait 9:16 format	360×640, 480×854, 540×960, 576×1024, 640×1136, 720×1280, 864×1536, 900×1600, 1080×1920, 1440×2560, 2160×3840	phone, portrait monitors
0.6	3:5	3:5 portrait format	240×400, 480×800, 768×1280, 864×1440, 1080×1800	phones
0.625	5:8	5:8 portrait format	480×768, 600×960, 800×1280, 900×1440, 960×1536, 1050×1680, 1200×1920	phones, portrait monitors
0.6̅	2:3	2:3 portrait format	320×480, 480×720, 640×960, 768×1152, 864×1280, 960×1440, 1024×1536, 1280×1920	phones, tablets in portrait, monitors
0.75	3:4	3:4 portrait format	240×320, 480×640, 600×800, 768×1024, 864×1152, 960×1280, 1024×1366, 1050×1400, 1080×1440, 1200×1600, 1440×1920, 1536×2048, 1620×2160, 1728×2304, 1920×2560, 2048×2732, 2100×2800, 2160×2880, 2400×3200	PDA, some phones, tablets and monitors
0.8	4:5	4:5 portrait format	576×720, 640×800, 720×900, 768×960, 864×1080, 960×1200, 1024×1280, 1080×1350, 1280×1600, 1440×1800, 2048×2560	some monitors in vertical mode
0.8̅	8:9	Vertical 9:8	640×720, 720×810, 864×960, 960×1080, 1280×1440, 1600×1800, 1920×2160, 2160×2400	-
1.0	1:1	Square	512×512, 768×768, 864×864, 960×960, 1024×1024, 1080×1080, 1280×1280, 1440×1440, 1536×1536, 1600×1600, 1620×1620, 1800×1800, 1920×1920, 2048×2048, 2160×2160, 2560×2560, 2880×2880, 3072×3072, 3200×3200, 3240×3240, 3600×3600, 3840×3840, 4096×4096, 4320×4320, 5120×5120, 5760×5760, 6144×6144, 6400×6400, 6480×6480, 7200×7200, 7680×7680, 8192×8192	monitors
1.0̅5̅2̅6̅3̅1̅5̅7̅8̅9̅	20:19	20:19 format	160×152, 320×304, 640×608, 1280×1216, 2560×2432, 5120×4864	-
1.0̅8̅3̅	13:12	Near-square 13:12 format	832×768, 1280×1182, 1664×1536, 1920×1772, 3328×3072	-
1.1̅1̅	10:9	10:9 format	160×144, 320×288, 640×576, 1280×1152, 2560×2304, 5120×4608	-
1.125	9:8	9:8 format	720×640, 810×720, 960×864, 1080×960, 1440×1280, 1800×1600, 2160×1920, 2400×2160!	-
1.1̅4̅2̅8̅5̅7̅	8:7	8:7 format	800×700, 824×720, 960×840, 1024×896, 1280×1120, 1440×1260, 1536×1344, 1600×1400, 1920×1680, 2048×1792, 2304×2016, 2400×2100, 2560×2240, 2880×2520, 3072×2688, 3200×2800	-
1.1̅8̅5̅	32:27	DVCPRO HD	640×540, 800×675, 960×810, 1024×864, 1280×1080, 1600×1350, 1920×1620, 2048×1728, 2560×2160, 3200×2700, 3840×3240	1x
1.2	6:5	6:5 displayes	864×720, 1024×854, 1080×900, 1152×960, 1200×1000, 1296×1080, 1440×1200, 1536×1280, 1800×1500, 2400×2000, 2592×2160, 2880×2400, 3072×2560	-
1.22̅	11:9	11:9 formats	352×288, 704×576, 1408×1152, 2816×2304	-
1.25	5:4	DV PAL, SXGA	320×256, 400×320, 480×384, 512×410, 540×432, 640×512, 720×576, 800×640, 960×768, 1024×820, 1080×864, 1200×960, 1280×1024, 1500×1200, 1600×1280, 1800×1440, 1920×1536, 2160×1728, 2560×2048, 3200×2560, 4320×3456, 5120×4096, 6000×4800, 7680×6144, 8000×6400, 8640×6912, 10240×8192, 10800×8640, 11520×9000, 12800×10240	1x, monitors
1.28	32:25	32:25 displayes	800×625, 1024×800, 1152×900, 1280×1000, 1310×1024 1382×1080, 1408×1100, 1536×1200, 1600×1250, 1844×1440, 1968×1536, 2048×1600, 2304×1800, 2560×2000, 2621×2048, 2764×2160, 3072×2400	-
1.32̅4̅7̅1̅7̅9̅5̅7̅	≈4:3 Plastic	Plastic ratio	1017×768, 1144×864, 1272×960, 1356×1024, 1432×1080, 1526×1152, 1696×1280, 1908×1440, 2035×1536, 2146×1620, 2288×1728, 2384×1800, 2544×1920, 2712×2048, 2864×2160	-
1.33̅	4:3	Video Graphics Array	160×120, 200×150, 256×192, 288×216, 320×240, 400×300, 480×360, 512×384, 576×432, 640×480, 704×528, 720×540, 800×600, 900×675, 960×720, 1000×750, 1024×768, 1080×810, 1152×864, 1200×900, 1280×960, 1366×1024, 1400×1050, 1440×1080, 1600×1200, 1800×1350, 1920×1440, 2000×1500, 2048×1536, 2160×1620, 2304×1728, 2400×1800, 2560x1920, 2732×2048, 2800x2100, 2880×2160, 3072×2304, 3200×2400, 3840×2880, 4096×3072, 4800×3600, 5120×3840, 5464×4096, 6144×4608, 6400×4800, 7168×5376, 7680×5760, 8000×6000, 8192×6144, 9600×7200, 10240×7680, 10800×8100, 11520×8640, 12800×9600	SDTV
1.375	11:8	11:8 filmes	1100×800, 1200×864, 1280×930, 1600×1152, 1920×1400, 2560×1862, 3663×2664	1x
1.4	7:5	7:5 displayes	1024×731, 1216×864, 1344×960, 1680×1200, 1800×1280, 1920×1366, 2160×1536, 2408×1728, 2880×2048, 3000×2120, 3392×2400,	tablets
1.42̅	64:45	64:45 displayes	1024×720, 1152×800, 1232×864, 1280×900, 1366×960, 1536×1080, 2048×1440, 2560×1800, 2880×2000, 3072×2160, 4096×2880	tablets, laptops
1.44	36:25	36:25 format	1728×1200, 1920×1350, 2304×1600, 2560×1776, 3440×2400, 3456×2400	-
1.45—1.47	from 29:20 to 147:100	29:20 format	1680×1152, 1920×1300, 2048×1400, 2880×1970, 3072×2100, 3192×2160, 3200×2200	-
1.5	3:2	DV NTSC / laptops	360×240, 384×256, 400×264, 432×288, 450×300, 480×320, 540×360, 576×384, 600×400, 640×427, 720×480, 864×576, 960×640, 1024×672, 1080×720, 1152×768, 1200×800, 1200×810, 1280×854, 1280×864, 1296×864, 1366×900, 1440×960, 1536×1024, 1600×1064, 1600×1080, 1620×1080, 1728×1152, 1800×1200, 1896×1280, 1920×1280, 2048×1366, 2160×1440, 2256×1504, 2304×1536, 2400×1600, 2400×1620, 2430×1620, 2560×1706, 2560×1728, 2688×1792, 2700×1800, 2880×1920, 3000×2000, 3018×2012, 3048×2032, 3072×2048, 3120×2080, 3200×2136, 3200×2160, 3240×2160, 3360×2240, 3456×2304, 3600×2400, 3840×2560, 3912×2608, 4096×2730, 4320×2880, 4608×3072, 4800×3200, 4800×3240, 4860×3240, 5120×3412, 5120×3456, 5376×3584, 5400×3600, 5760×3840, 6000×4000, 6144×4096, 6400×4264, 6400×4320, 6720×4480, 6880×4586, 6912×4608, 7680×5120, 8192×5464	1x, tablets, laptops, phones
1.5̅3̅8̅4̅6̅1̅	20:13	widescreen	1280×832, 1920×1248, 2560×1664, 3840×2496, 5120×3328	-
1.5̅4̅5̅0̅6̅4̅3̅7̅7̅6̅8̅	360:233	widescreen	1440×932, 2160×1398, 2880×1864, 4320×2796, 5760×3728	-
1.5625	25:16	25:16 widescreen	1000×640, 1200×768, 1280×820, 1400×900, 1408×900, 1500×960, 1600×1024, 1800×1152, 2000×1280, 2350×1512, 2400×1536, 2500×1600, 3000×1920, 3136×2007, 3200×2048, 4000×2560, 4800×3072, 5000×3200, 5600×3456, 6400×4096, 7200×4608, 8000×5120, 9600×6144, 10000×6400, 11200×7168, 12800×8192, 14000×8960, 14400×9216, 15360×9830, 16000×10240	monitors
1.6	8:5	16:10 widescreen (PC only)	320×200, 384×240, 460×288, 480×300, 576×360, 640×400, 768×480, 800×500, 864×540, 960×600, 1024×640, 1080×675, 1152×720, 1228×768, 1280×800, 1384×864, 1440×900, 1536×960, 1640×1024, 1680×1050, 1728×1080, 1843×1152, 1920×1200, 2048×1280, 2160×1350, 2240×1400, 2304×1440, 2400×1500, 2560×1600, 2880×1800, 3072×1920, 3280×2048, 3360×2100, 3456×2160, 3686×2304, 3840×2400, 4096×2560, 4320×2700, 4608×2880, 4800×3000, 5120×3200, 5760×3600, 6144×3840, 6400×4000, 7680×4800, 8192×5120, 8640×5400, 9600×6000, 10240×6400, 11520×7200, 12288×7680, 12800×8000, 13824×8640, 14400×9000, 15360×9600, 16384×10240	tablets, monitors, laptops, some phones
1.618	16:10	16:10 Tallboy, golden ratio	640×400, 960×600, 1280×800, 1440×900, 1680×1050, 1920×1200, 2560×1600, 3840×2400	-
1.625	13:8	Widescreen	1248×768, 1404×864, 1560×960, 1664×1024, 1755×1080, 1872×1152, 1950×1200, 2080×1280, 2340×1440, 2496×1536, 2600×1600, 3080×1896, 3120×1920, 3328×2048, 3512×2160, 3900×2400, 4160×2560	-
1.66̅	5:3 (20:12 format)	European Widescreen	400×240, 600×360, 800×480, 900×540, 960×576, 1200×720, 1280×768, 1440×864, 1600×960, 1704×1024, 1800×1080, 1920×1152, 2000×1200, 2132×1280, 2250×1350, 2400×1440, 2560×1536, 2880×1728, 3072×1843, 3200×1920, 3408×2048, 3600×2160, 3840×2304, 4000×2400, 4096×2460, 4264×2560, 4800×2880, 5120×3072, 5400×3240, 5760×3456, 6144×3686, 7200×4320, 7680×4608, 8192×4920	Super 16 mm , phones, tablets
1.7̅0̅6̅	128:75	17:10 Widescreen	1024×600, 1280×750, 1536×900, 1792×1050, 1920×1125, 2048×1200, 2560×1500, 3072×1800, 3584×2100, 4096×2400, 4608×2700, 5120×3000, 6144×3600, 8192×4800, 8640×5072, 10240×6000	-
1.75	7:4	Widescreen	1344×768, 1400×800, 1680×960, 1890×1080, 1920×1100, 2520×1440, 2800×1600, 3360×1920, 3584×2048, 3780×2160, 3840×2200	monitors
1.77̅	16:9	Widescreen	854×480 , 960×540, 1024×576, 1066×600, 1152×648, 1280×720, 1366×768, 1440×810, 1536×864, 1600×900, 1680×945, 1706×960, 1820×1024, 1920×1080, 2048×1152, 2160×1215, 2304×1296, 2560×1440, 2880×1620, 3072×1728, 3200×1800, 3640×2048, 3840×2160, 4096×2304, 4320×2430, 4608×2592, 5120×2880, 5760×3240, 6016×3384, 7680×4320, 8640×4860, 10240×5760, 11520×6480, 12032×6768, 15360×8640	Anamorphic 1.5x on 32:27, HDTV
1.8	9:5	Widescreen	1080×600, 1152×640, 1280×700, 1296×720, 1382×768, 1440×800, 1556×864, 1620×900, 1728×960, 1800×1000, 1944×1080, 2160×1200, 2304×1280, 2560×1400, 2592×1440, 2880×1600, 3240×1800, 3456×1920, 3686×2048, 3888×2160, 4320×2400, 4608×2560, 5120×2800, 5184×2880, 5760×3200, 7776×4320, 8192×4551, 8640×4800	-
1.8̅1̅	20:11	Widescreen	1080×594, 1280×704, 1600×884, 1920×1056, 2560×1408, 3200×1768, 3840×2112, 5120×2816	-
1.85	37:20	"Flat" DCI	1600×864, 2000×1080, 3000×1620, 4000×2160, 6000×3240, 8000×4320, 12000×6480, 16000×8640	1x
1.875	15:8	15:8 format	1280×683, 1440×768, 1519×810, 1620×864, 1688×900, 1800×960, 1875×1000, 1920×1024, 2025×1080, 2160×1152, 2250×1200, 2400×1280, 2560×1366, 2880×1536, 3240×1728, 3376×1800, 3600×1920, 3840×2048, 4096×2184, 4320×2304, 4500×2400, 4800×2560, 5120×2732, 5760×3072, 7168×3840, 7680×4096, 8640×4608	-
1.88̅	17:9	Widescreen	1360×720, 1700×900, 2040×1080, 2720×1440, 3400×1800, 4080×2160	phones
1.89̅6̅2̅	256:135	"Full" DCI	1024×540, 1152×608, 1366×720, 1440×768, 1536×810, 1640×864, 1920×1013, 2048×1080, 2560×1350, 2728×1440, 2732×1440, 3072×1620, 3840×2025, 3883×2048, 4096×2160, 4608×2400, 4608×2430, 5120×2700, 5464×2880, 6144×3240, 7168×3780, 7680×4050, 7766×4096, 8192×4320, 8640×4608, 9216×4860, 10240×5400, 12288×6480, 16384×8640	1x
1.92	48:25	Wide 48:25	1384×720, 1728×900, 2074×1080, 2768×1440, 3456×1800, 4148×2160	-
1.95	39:20	Wide 39:20	936×480, 1053×540, 1404×720, 1580×810, 1872×960, 2106×1080, 2496×1280, 2808×1440, 3159×1620	-
2.0	2:1	VistaVision / Univisium	480×240, 512×256, 540×270, 576×288, 640×320, 720×360, 864×432, 960×540, 1080×540, 1152×576, 1200×600, 1280×640, 1344×672, 1350×675, 1440×720, 1536×768, 1600×800, 1620×810, 1728×864, 1800×900, 1920×960, 2048×1024, 2160×1080, 2304×1152, 2400×1200, 2560×1280, 2688×1344, 2700×1350, 2880×1440, 3072×1536, 3200×1600, 3240×1620, 3456×1728, 3600×1800, 3840×1920, 4096×2048, 4320×2160, 4608×2304, 4800×2400, 5120×2560, 5400×2700, 5760×2880, 6144×3072, 6400×3200, 6480×3240, 7200×3600, 7680×3840, 8192×4096, 8640×4320, 9216×4608, 9600×4800, 10240×5120, 10800×5400, 11520×5760, 12288×6144, 12800×6400, 12960×6480, 15360×7680, 16384×8192, 17280×8640	VR cameras (most), smartphones
2.05̅	37:18	Wide	1480×720, 2220×1080, 2960×1440, 4440×2160	smartphones
2.11̅	19:9	Wide	1520×720, 2160×1024, 2280×1080, 3040×1440, 4320×2048, 4560×2160	smartphones
2.13̅	32:15	Wide	1280×600, 1440×675, 1536×720, 1600×768, 1800×844, 1843×864, 1920×900, 2048×960, 2304×1080, 2560×1200, 3072×1440, 3200×1536, 3456×1620, 3600×1688, 3686×1728, 3840×1800, 4096×1920, 4608×2160	-
2.16̅	13:6	Wide	1560×720, 2340×1080, 3120×1440, 4680×2160	smartphones
2.2	11:5	UltraWide	1280×581, 1408×640, 1584×720, 1600×728, 1760×800, 1826×830, 1900×864, 1920×873, 1980×900, 2048×932, 2376×1080, 2560×1164, 3168×1440, 3200×1456, 3520×1600, 3652×1660, 3840×1746, 3960×1800, 4096×1864, 4752×2160, 5120×2328, 6336×2880, 7128×3240, 7680×3492, 8192×3728	smartphones, some filmes
2.22̅	20:9	UltraWide 20:9	1600×720, 1920×864, 2000×900, 2132×960, 2400×1080, 2560×1152, 3200×1440, 3840×1728, 4000×1800, 4800×2160	smartphones
2.27̅	41:18	UltraWide	1640×720, 2460×1080, 3280×1440, 4920×2160	smartphones
2.2̅8̅5̅7̅1̅4̅	16:7	UltraWide 16:7 format	1280×560, 1440×630, 1680×735, 1920×840, 2048×896, 2560×1120, 3072×1344, 3200×1400, 3840×1680, 4096×1792, 4936×2160, 5120×2240	-
2.29̅3̅	172:75	Ultrawide	2408×1050, 2752×1200, 3212×1575, 4816×2100	some devices
2.33̅	7:3	UltraWide, True 21:9	1680×720, 1792×768, 2016×864, 2240×960, 2400×1024, 2520×1080, 2800×1200, 3200×1366, 3360×1440, 3584×1536, 3840×1644, 4200×1800, 4800×2048, 5040×2160	smartphones, monitors
2.34̅6̅8̅5̅3̅1̅	1678:715	Cinemascope (1950s–1970s)	analog	Anamorphic 2x on 35 mm with optical audio
2.3̅7̅0̅	64:27	"21:9" ultrawide	1024×432, 1138×480, 1280×540, 1536×648, 1600×675, 1706×720, 1820×768, 1920×810, 2048×864, 2132×900, 2276×960, 2400×1012, 2432×1026, 2560×1080, 3072×1296, 3200×1350, 3414×1440, 3840×1620, 4096×1728, 4264×1800, 5120×2160, 6144×2592, 7680×3240, 8192×3456, 10240×4320, 15360×6480, 20480×8640	Dashcam, Anamorphic 1.33x on 16:9, 1.25x on DCI 256:135, 2x on 32:27
2.3̅8̅6̅9̅4̅6̅	1024:429	"Scope" DCI cinema format	2048×858, 4096×1716, 8192×3432	1x
2.38̅	43:18	"21:9" ultrawide (PC only)	1720×720, 2580×1080, 3440×1440, 5160×2160, 6880×2880, 10320×4320, 13760×5760	-
2.4	12:5	24:10, 12:5 ultrawide	1728×720, 1920×800, 2160×900, 2592×1080, 2880×1200, 3072×1280, 3456×1440, 3840×1600, 4320×1800, 5760×2400, 6144×2560, 6480×2700, 6912×2880, 7680×3200, 8640×3600, 10368×4320, 11520×4800, 12288×5120, 12960×5400, 13824×5760, 15360×6400	-
2.414	12:5 Silver ratio	Silver UltraWide	2608×1080, 2896×1200, 3862×1600, 4344×1800, 5216×2160	
2.4̅	22:9	UltraWide	704×288, 880×360, 1172×480, 1320×540, 1760×720, 2640×1080, 3520×1440, 5280×2160	smartphones, Galaxy Fold
2.5	5:2	UltraWide	1280×512, 1600×640, 2160×864, 2560×1024, 2880×1152, 3200×1280, 3600×1440, 4000×1600, 5120×2048, 5400×2160, 6000x2400	monitors
2.55	51:20	Cinemascope 55	analog	Anamorphic 2x on 35 mm without optical audio
2.5̅	23:9	UltraWide	1840×720, 2760×1980, 3680×1440, 5520×2160	-
2.6	13:5	Ultra-Wide	1248×480, 1872×720, 2340×900, 2808×1080, 3744×1440, 4680×1800, 5616×2160	-
2.6̅	8:3	Cinerama / 24:9 ultrawide (PC only)	1280×480, 1440×540, 1536×576, 1600×600, 1792×672, 1800×675, 1920×720, 2048×768, 2304×864, 2560×960, 2800×1050, 2880×1080, 3840×1440, 4096×1536, 4800×1800, 5120×1920, 5760×2160, 7680×2880, 8192×3072, 10240×3840	2х
2.7̅	25:9	UltraWide	2000×720, 3000×1080, 4000×1440, 6000×2160	-
2.76	69:25	Ultra Panavision	analog	Anamorphic 1.25x on 70 mm
2.8	14:5	Ultrawide	2016×720, 2520×900, 3024×1080, 4032×1440, 5040×1800, 6048×2160	-
2.8̅	26:9	UltraWide	2080×720, 3120×1080, 4160×1440, 6240×2160	-
3.0	3:1	SuperWide	1440×480, 1536×512, 1600×540, 1620×540, 1728×576, 1800×600, 1920×640, 2048×683, 2160×720, 2304×768, 2400×800, 2430×810, 2560×864, 2592×864, 2880×960, 3072×1024, 3200×1064, 3240×1080, 3456×1152, 3600×1200, 3840×1280, 4096×1366, 4320×1440, 4608×1536, 4800×1600, 4860×1620, 5120×1728, 5184×1728, 5400×1800, 5760×1920, 6144×2048, 6400×2132, 6480×2160, 7200×2400, 7680×2560, 8192×2732, 8640×2880, 9600×3200, 10240×3456, 10368×3456	-
3.125	50:16	SuperWide	3200×1024, 3600×1152, 4000×1280, 4800×1536, 6400×2048, 8000×2560, 9600×3072, 12800×4096	-
3.2	16:5	32:10 super wide (PC only)	2560×800, 2880×900, 3072×960, 3360×1050, 3456×1080, 3840×1200, 4096×1280, 4608×1440, 5120×1600, 5760×1800, 6144×1920, 6720×2100, 6912×2160, 7680×2400, 8192×2560, 9216×2880, 10240×3200, 11520×3600, 13824×4320, 15360×4800	-
3.4	17:5	17:5 superwide	3060×900, 3672×1080, 4080×1200, 4896×1440, 6120×1800, 6528×1920, 7344×2160, 8160×2400, 12240×3600, 13056×3840, 14688×4320	-
3.5̅	32:9	32:9 super wide (PC only)	2560×720, 2732×768, 3200×900, 3840×1080, 4096×1152, 5120×1440, 6400×1800, 7680×2160, 10240×2880, 11520×3240, 12032×3384, 13624×3840, 15360×4320	-
3.6	18:5	36:10 super wide (ultra-widescreen 3.6)	4320×1200, 5760×1600, 6480×1800, 8640×2400, 11520×3200, 12960×3600, 17280×4800	1x
4.0	4:1	Polyvision	analog / 3 images 4:3 projected side by side, 1920×480, 2160×540, 2560×640, 2880×720, 3200×800, 3456×864, 3600×900, 3840×960, 4096×1024, 4320×1080, 5120×1280, 5760×1440, 6144×1536, 6400×1600, 7200×1800, 7680×1920, 8192×2048, 8640×2160, 9600×2400, 10240×2560, 11520×2880, 12800×3200, 15360×3840, 17280×4320	3x

== See also ==
- 14:9 aspect ratio
- Display resolution standards
- Angle of view
- Field of view in video games
- Dot pitch
- Pixel density
