= Display aspect ratio =

Ratio between a display's width and height

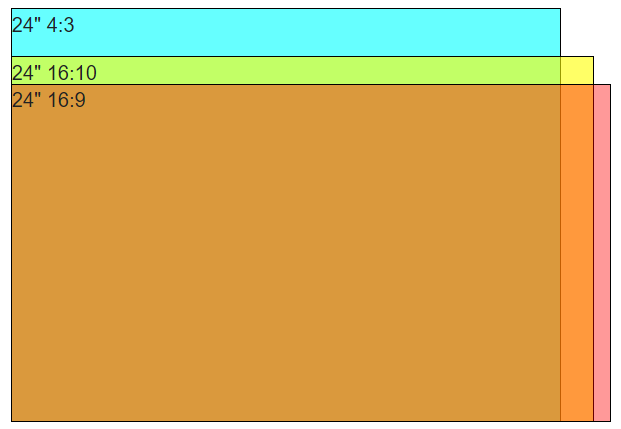
Some common aspect ratios for computer displays. 4:3 is an old non-widescreen monitor standard, also used in some tablet computers. The first popular widescreen ratio for computer displays was 16:10, and 16:9 has been the most common ratio since 2012.

The display aspect ratio (DAR) is the aspect ratio of a display device. It is a proportional relationship between the physical width and the height of the display. It is expressed as a pair of integer numbers separated by a colon (x:y), where x corresponds to the width and y to the height. Common aspect ratios for displays, past and present, include 5:4, 4:3, 16:10, and 16:9.

== Related ratios ==
It is important to distinguish:

- The display aspect ratio (DAR) is calculated from the physical width and height of a display, measured each in inch or cm (Display size).
- The pixel aspect ratio (PAR) is calculated from the width and height of one pixel.
- The storage aspect ratio (SAR) is calculated from the numbers of pixels in width and height stated in the display resolution.

Because the units cancel out, all aspect ratios are unitless.

== Diagonal and area ==
The size of a television set or computer monitor is given as the diagonal measurement of its display area, usually in inches. Wider aspect ratios result in smaller overall area, given the same diagonal.

Comparison between monitors with a diagonal of 23 inches (58 cm)
DAR	Image dimensions	Display area	Image area 4:3 content	Image area 16:9 content	Image area 2.35:1 content
4:3	18.4 in × 13.8 in (47 cm × 35 cm)	254.0 sq in (1,639 cm^{2})	254.0 sq in (1,639 cm^{2})	189.9 sq in (1,225 cm^{2})	143.7 sq in (927 cm^{2})
16:10	19.5 in × 12.2 in (50 cm × 31 cm)	237.7 sq in (1,534 cm^{2})	197.6 sq in (1,275 cm^{2})	213.7 sq in (1,379 cm^{2})	161.6 sq in (1,043 cm^{2})
16:9	20.1 in × 11.3 in (51 cm × 29 cm)	226.0 sq in (1,458 cm^{2})	168.9 sq in (1,090 cm^{2})	226.0 sq in (1,458 cm^{2})	171.2 sq in (1,105 cm^{2})

== TVs ==
Most televisions were built with an aspect ratio of 4:3 until the late 2000s, when widescreen TVs with 16:9 displays became the standard. This aspect ratio was chosen as the geometric mean between 4:3 and 2.35:1, an average of the various aspect ratios used in film. While 16:9 is well-suited for modern HDTV broadcasts, older 4:3 video has to be either padded with bars on the left and right side (pillarboxed), cropped or stretched, while movies shot with wider aspect ratios are usually letterboxed, with black bars at the top and bottom.

Since the turn of the 21st century, many music videos began shooting on widescreen aspect ratio.

== Computer displays ==
As of 2016, most computer monitors use widescreen displays with an aspect ratio of 16:9, although some portable PCs use taller aspect ratios like 3:2 and 16:10 while some high-end desktop monitors have adopted ultrawide displays.

The following table summarises the different aspect ratios that have been used in computer displays:

Aspect ratio	Example resolutions	Notes
1:1	1920×1920	Used in some desktop and professional monitors.
5:4 (1.25:1)	1280×1024	Common until the late 2000s.
4:3 (1.33:1)	1024×768, 1600×1200, 2560×1920, 960×720	The standard aspect ratio for computer software, videogames, and analog video until the 2000s, as well as for early 35 mm film. Used on some modern devices such as the iPad.
3:2 (1.5:1)	2160×1440, 2560×1700^{†}, 3000×2000, 1500×1000	Used in some portable PCs since the early 2010s. Popularity has increased in recent years, e.g. in Microsoft Surface devices.
8:5 (1.6:1)	1280×800, 1920×1200, 2560×1600, 3840×2400	More commonly referred to as 16:10. Common on computer displays of the 2000s and 2010s, continued use on MacBooks, since 2021 becoming increasingly popular again in notebooks (Dell, Lenovo and others).
16:9 (1.78:1)	1366×768^{†}, 1920×1080, 2560×1440, 3840×2160 (4K UHD)	The default aspect ratio for HDTV and modern computer displays.
256:135 (1.89̅6̅2̅:1)	2048×1080, 4096×2160	The Digital Cinema Initiatives standard for 4K resolution; specification created in 2005 but not widely sold until 2014–15
64:27 (2.3̅7̅0̅:1)	2560×1080, 3440×1440	Used in some professional and gaming displays since the mid 2010s, roughly matches various anamorphic formats
32:9 (3.5̅:1)	3840×1080, 5120×1440	Used in some high-end displays since 2017.
4:1	17280×4320	Used in some advertisement displays.

^{†} The aspect ratio is approximate.

=== History ===
==== 4:3, 5:4 and 16:10 ====
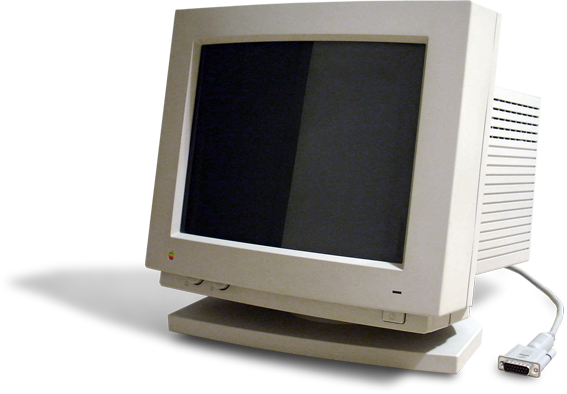
A 4:3 monitor

Until about 2003, most computer monitors used an aspect ratio of 4:3, and in some cases 5:4. For cathode ray tubes (CRTs) 4:3 was most common even in resolutions where this meant the pixels would not be square (e.g. 320×200 or 1280×1024 on a 4:3 display). Between 2003 and 2006, monitors with 16:10 aspect ratio became commonly available, first in laptops and later also in standalone computer monitors. Reasons for this transition was productive uses for such monitors, i.e. besides widescreen movie viewing and computer game play, are the word processor display of two standard A4 or letter pages side by side, as well as CAD displays of large-size drawings and CAD application menus at the same time. 16:10 became the most common sold aspect ratio for widescreen computer monitors until 2008.

==== 16:9 ====
In 2009, the computer industry started to move from 4:3 and 16:10 to 16:9 as the standard aspect ratio for monitors and laptops. A 2008 report by DisplaySearch cited a number of reasons for this shift, including the ability for PC and monitor manufacturers to expand their product ranges by offering products with wider screens and higher resolutions, helping consumers to more easily adopt such products and "stimulating the growth of the notebook PC and LCD monitor market".

By 2010, virtually all computer monitor and laptop manufacturers had also moved to the 16:9 aspect ratio, and the availability of 16:10 aspect ratio in mass market had become very limited. In 2011, non-widescreen displays with 4:3 aspect ratios still were being manufactured, but in small quantities. The reasons for this according to Bennie Budler, product manager of IT products at Samsung South Africa was that the "demand for the old 'Square monitors' has decreased rapidly over the last couple of years". He also predicted that "by the end of 2011, production on all 4:3 or similar panels will be halted due to a lack of demand."

In 2012, 1920×1080 (Full HD) was the most commonly used resolution among Steam users. At the same time, the most common resolution globally was 1366×768, overtaking the previous leader 1024×768. In 2021, the 2K resolution of 1920×1080 was used by two thirds of the Steam users for the primary display with 1366×768 and 2560×1440 both at about eight percent taking the majority of the remaining resolutions.

==== 3:2 ====
3:2 displays first appeared in laptop computers in 2001 with the PowerBook G4 line, but did not enter the mainstream until the 2010s with the Chromebook Pixel and 2-in-1 PCs like Microsoft's Surface line. As of 2018, a number of manufacturers are either producing or planning to produce portable PCs with 3:2 displays.

==== 21:9 ====
Since 2014, a number of high-end desktop monitors have been released that use ultrawide displays with aspect ratios that roughly match the various anamorphic formats used in film, but are commonly marketed as 21:9. Resolutions for such displays include 2560×1080 (64:27), 3440×1440 (43:18) and 3840×1600 (12:5).

==== 32:9 ====
In 2017, Samsung released a curved gaming display with an aspect ratio of 32:9 and resolution of 3840×1080.

==== 256:135 ====
Since 2011, several monitors complying with the Digital Cinema Initiatives 4K standard have been produced; this standard specifies a resolution of 4096×2160, giving an aspect ratio of ≈1.896:1.

==== 1:1 ====
A 1:1 aspect ratio results in a square display. One of the available monitors for desktop use of this format is Eizo EV2730Q (27", 1920 × 1920 Pixels, from 2015), however such monitors are also often found in air traffic control displays (connected using standard computer cabling, like DVI or DisplayPort) and on aircraft as part of avionic equipment (often connected directly using LVDS, SPI interfaces or other specialized means). This 1920×1920 display can also be used as the centerpiece of a three-monitor array with one WUXGA set in vertical position on each side, resulting in 4320×1920 (a ratio of 9:4) - and no distortion with the Eizo 27" 1:1 if the side displays are 22".

=== Suitability for software and content ===
==== Games ====
From 2005 to 2013, most video games were mainly made for the 16:9 aspect ratio and 16:9 computer displays therefore offer the best compatibility. 16:9 video games are letterboxed on a 16:10 or 4:3 display or have reduced field of view.

As of 2013, many games are adopting support for 21:9 ultrawide resolutions, which can give a gameplay advantage due to increased field of view, although this is not always the case.

4:3 monitors have the best compatibility with older games released prior to 2005 when that aspect ratio was the mainstream standard for computer displays.

==== Video ====
As of 2017, the most common aspect ratio for TV broadcasts is 16:9, whereas movies are generally made in the wider 21:9 aspect ratio. Most modern TVs are 16:9, which causes letterboxing when viewing 21:9 content, and pillarboxing when viewing 4:3 content such as older films or TV broadcasts, unless the content is cropped or stretched to fill the entire display.

==== Productivity applications ====
For viewing documents in A4 paper size (which has a 1.41:1 aspect ratio), whether in portrait mode or two side-by-side in landscape mode, 4:3, 2:3 or 16:10 fit best. For photographs in the standard 135 film and print size (with a 3:2 aspect ratio), 2:3 or 16:10 fit best; for photographs taken with older consumer-level digital cameras, 4:3 fits perfectly.

== Smartphones ==
Until 2010, smartphones used different aspect ratios, including 3:2 and 5:3. From 2010 to 2017 most smartphone manufacturers switched to using 16:9 widescreen displays, driven at least partly by the growing popularity of HD video using the same aspect ratio.

Since 2017, a number of smartphones have been released using 18:9 or even wider aspect ratios (such as 19.5:9 or 20:9); such displays are expected to appear on increasingly more phones. Reasons for this trend include the ability for manufacturers to use a nominally larger display without increasing the width of the phone, being able to accommodate the on-screen navigation buttons without reducing usable app area, more area available for split-screen apps in portrait orientation, as well as the 18:9 ratio being well-suited for VR applications and the proposed Univisium film format. On the other hand, the disadvantages of taller 18:9 aspect ratio phones with some phones even going up to 20:9, 21:9, or even 22:9 in the case of Samsung's Z Flip series, is reduced one-handed reachability, being less convenient to carry around in the pocket as they stick out and reduced overall screen surface area.

== See also ==
- 14:9 aspect ratio
- Computer monitor
- Display resolution
- Field of view in video games
- Display resolution standards
- Ultrawide formats
