= Field of view (disambiguation) =

Field of view can refer to:

- Angle of view, which also describes the field of view in photography and image processing
- Field of view, in general and biological contexts
- Field of view in video games
- The J-Pop band Field of View
- A music track from the video game Hyperdimension Neptunia Mk2
