= List of Balochi-language television channels =

This is a list of television channels that broadcast in the Balochi language.

== Current channels ==
=== News ===
- VSH News

=== General entertainment ===
- Balochistan TV (Balochi)
- PTV Bolan
- PTV National (partially available in Balochi)
- Sabzbaat Balochistan TV

== Former channels ==
=== General entertainment ===
- PTV Balochistan

== See also ==
- Balochi cinema
