= Hammal O Mahganj =

- Release date: 1976
- Country: Pakistan
- Language: Balochi

Hammal O Mahganj is a Pakistani Balochi-language film released in 1976. It is known as the first feature Balochi film. The film could not make it to the cinemas due to political pressure. The film was produced by Anwar Iqbal who also played the lead role in the film along with Nadir Shah Adil, Aneeta Gul, Saqi and Noor Mohammad Lashari. Set in the 15th century when Portuguese discovered the Indian subcontinent, the story revolves around a man who stands against the Portuguese for the honour of his motherland. The film was screened in 2017 on 28 February, at Baloch Culture day.

== Cast ==
- Anwar Iqbal
- Nadir Shah Adil
- Aneeta Gul
- Saqi
- Noor Muhammad Lashari
- Shakeel Laasi
