= Curved screen =

Electronic display with a concave viewing surface

A curved computer monitor with an ultrawide aspect ratio.

A curved screen is an electronic visual display that, contrasting with the flat-panel display, features a concave viewing surface. Curved screen projection displays, such as the Cinerama, have existed since the 1950s.

While curved screen TVs were introduced to the consumer market in 2013, primarily due to the efforts of South Korean companies Samsung and LG, they never became popular and were eventually discontinued. However, curved computer monitors remain popular.

== Analysis ==
Curved screens are often marketed as being able to provide an "immersive" experience, and allowing a wider field of view (FoV).

The optimal position of viewing a screen is directly along the central axis of the TV with the central point of the screen at eye level. Other viewing positions or angles may cause degradation in picture quality ranging anywhere from minor to severe, the most notable being trapezoidal distortion.

Manufacturers suggest that curved screens allow greater range in satisfactory viewing angles and offer minimal trapezoidal distortion in comparison to flat-screens. This claim is heavily disputed by another claim that a substantial offset from the center provides greater viewing distortion than that of a flat screen. However, the equidistant claim by manufacturers of the various parts of the screen from a centered view is supported.

Additionally, curved TVs supposedly offer minimized glare from ambient light.

The radius of curvature of a curved display is the radius that a circle would have if it had the same curvature as the display. This value is typically given in millimeters, but expressed with the letter "R" instead of a unit (for example, a display with "3800R curvature" has a 3800 mm radius of curvature.

== Applications ==
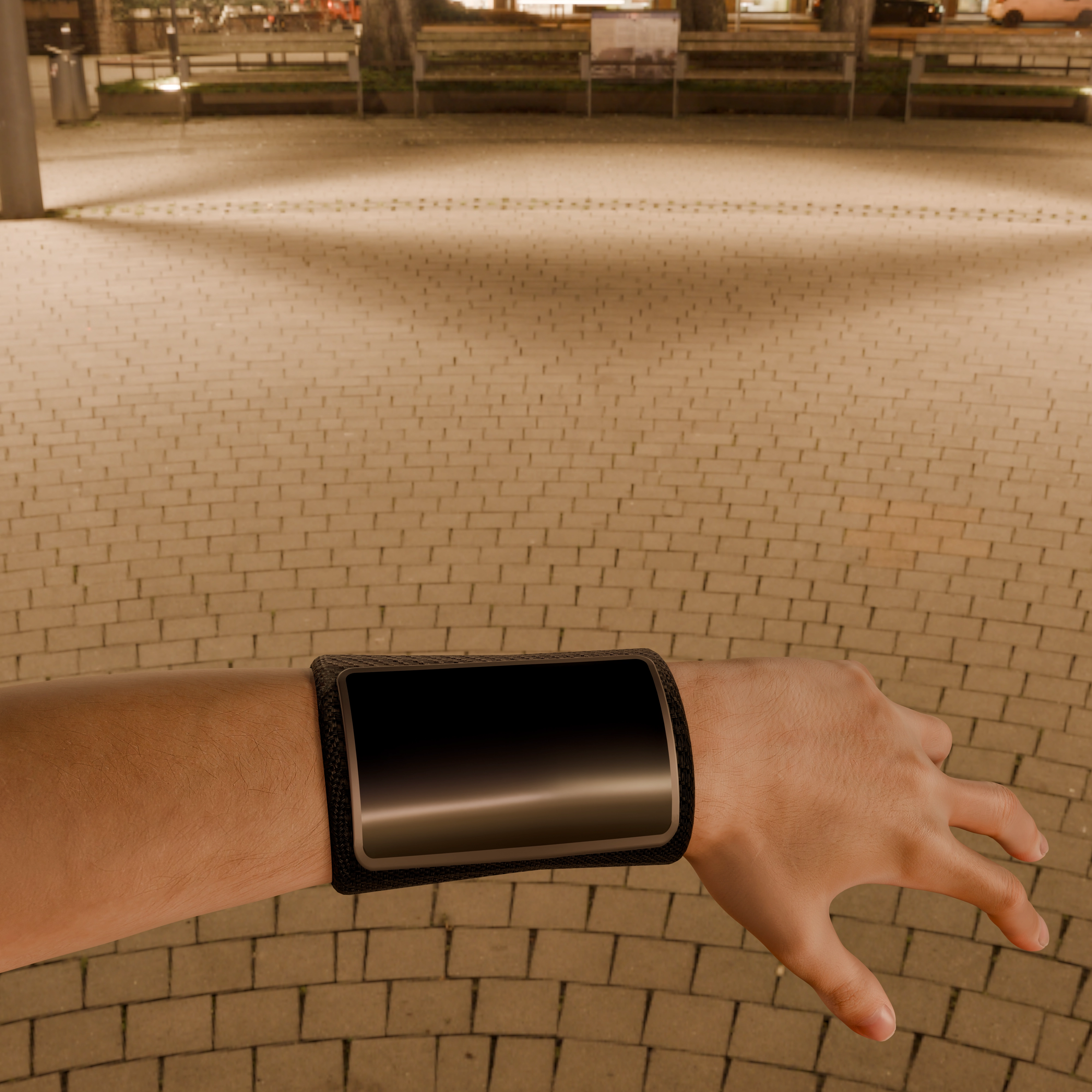
3D design of a wristband computer wearable with a curved screen

To reduce outer edge distortions and provide a panoramic view, large curved screens accomplish this free of bezel lines framing each screen, and the alternative was to use multiple flat-screen monitors around the viewer. Curved screens and multi-screens have applications in office or gaming.

Backward curved screens have the potential to be used as digital signage that can be installed at various locations to produce marketing exposure.

=== Projection screens ===
When projecting images onto a completely flat screen, the distance light has to travel from its point of origin (i.e., the projector) increases the farther away the destination point is from the screen's center. This variance in the distance traveled results in a distortion phenomenon known as the pincushion effect, where the image at the left and right edges of the screen becomes bowed inwards and stretched vertically, making the entire image appear blurry.

Curved screens are also widely used in IMAX and standard movie theaters for their ability to produce natural expressions and draw the audience deeper into the scene.

In about 2009, NEC/Alienware together with Ostendo Technologies, Inc. (based in Carlsbad, CA) were offering a curved (concave) 43-inch (110 cm) monitor that allows better viewing angles near the edges, covering 75% of peripheral vision in the horizontal direction. This monitor had 2880x900 resolution, 4 DLP rear projection systems with LED light sources and was marketed as suitable both for gaming and office work, while for $6499 it was rather expensive.

=== Touch on curved screen ===
One of the issues in the use of the curved screen in commercial electronics is how accurately it can work with a touch-sensor. To drive the solution, LG Electronics has developed infrared-based touch solutions for the curved display.

== History ==
The first curved screen was the Cinerama, which debuted in New York in 1952. Multiple theaters, including the Cinerama Dome in Hollywood began to use horizontally curved screens to counter image distortions associated with super-wide formats such as 23:9 CinemaScope.

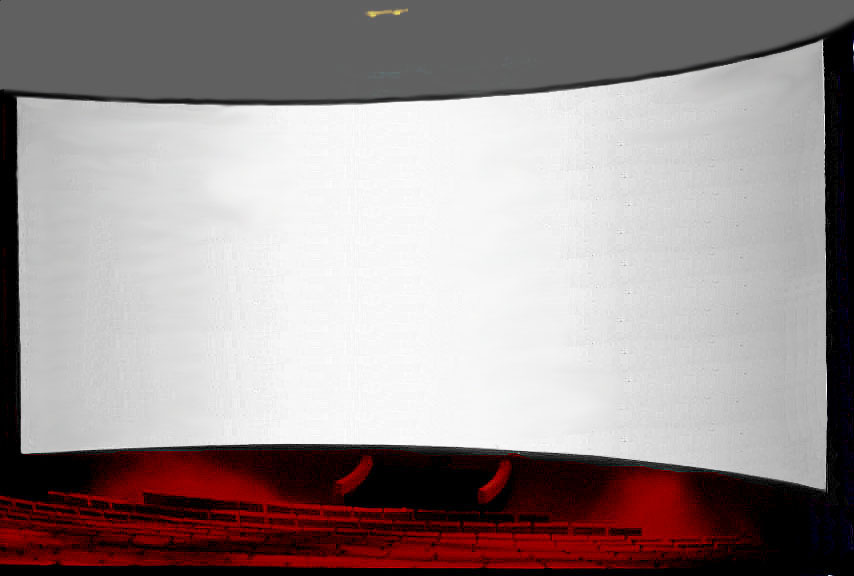
Cinerama-project screen

Computer monitors with an ultrawide aspect ratio were developed in order to display the maximum amount of information on a single screen. However, the extreme wideness of the screen reduced color accuracy on the outer edges of the screen. Curved ultrawide monitors were then developed to address this issue and provide a distortion-free, wide-angle viewing environment.

== Manufacturing ==
The first curved panels were produced by bending flat panels that had already been manufactured. This technique resulted in performance issues, such as oval mura (clouding effect) and color mixture (which causes color impurity and image distortion) observed at its curved edges. Since the introduction of flexible glass, liquid crystal displays (LCDs) can be applied to curved surfaces without bending existing panels. The screen technologies used to create curved LCD screens are vertical alignment (VA), which helps to reduce any white glow that may affect an angular view, and IPS panels, which are more susceptible to distortion.

== See also ==
- MSG Sphere
- IMAX Dome
- Evans & Sutherland
