= Anwar Iqbal =

Pakistani actor (1949–2021)

Muhammad Anwar iqbal
- Born: 25 December 1949; Lyari, Karachi, Pakistan
- Died: 1 July 2021 (aged 71); Lyari, Karachi, Pakistan
- Education: University of Karachi
- Occupations: Actor, director, producer
- Years active: 1976–2021
- Known for: Hammal o Mahganj, Shama; Akhri Chattan, Babur
- Spouse: Anika Anwar
- Children: Zabad Anwar, Dreen Anwar, Mahrang Anwar, Ayesha Anwar
- Parent: Haji Muhammad Iqbal Baloch

Anwar Iqbal Baloch (Urdu: انور اقبال) (25 December 1949 – 1 July 2021) was a Pakistani television actor and director, who achieved fame with the hit Pakistani drama series Shama (1976). He later starred in the PTV drama "Akhri Chattan" (آخری چٹان) written by Naseem Hijazi in the early 1980s. He was credited with the production of the first Balochi feature film, Hammal o Mahganj, in Pakistan.

== Early life ==
Born in Baghdadi, a residential town in Lyari, Karachi, Iqbal was the son of a well-known politician from Balochistan, Haji Muhammed Iqbal Baloch, who played prominent role in the independence of Pakistan as well as in highlighting the importance of Gwadar Port to the Pakistani government. He graduated with master's degree from University of Karachi and subsequently started pursuing his career in acting and theatre.

== Career ==
He began his career in 1976 with the production of "Hammal o Mahganj" which he also acted in. He then went on to produce the Sindhi drama "Dosten jo Piar" three years later. Despite working in plenty of series, his actual breakthrough was with the popular family drama series Shama, which became an immediate success and household name throughout the nation in the late 1970s and early 1980s and is still loved by many even now. He cited his initial success on the silver screen as a result of encouragement by the famous Pakistani writer Fatima Surayya Bajia and veteran director and producer Qasim Jalali. He rapidly emerged as a prominent actor with his memorable role in Shama as "Nana ki Jan Qamru (The beloved grandson of Qamar)". His debut as a director began with the Drama "Ishq Pecha" in 1984. Since then, he has acted in countless Urdu and Sindhi dramas and directed a few. He was also a popular teacher, teaching at a private school and working with a private TV channel.

He was particularly noted for his historical roles, by not only the public but also veteran PTV director Agha Nasir for his portrayal of Shiwani Khan (Muhammad Shaybani) in the PTV Series Babur, the life story of the first Mogul emperor Babur.

== Death ==
Iqbal was diabetic and also battling with cancer. He died on 1 July 2021, and his funeral prayers were offered at Baitul Mukarram mosque in Gulshan-i-Iqbal after Isha prayers. He was laid to rest at the Mewa Shah graveyard, Karachi.

== Filmography ==
=== Film ===
- Hammal O Mahganj

=== Television ===
Year	Title	Role	Language	Notes
1976	Shama		Urdu	
1979	Dosten Jo Pyaar		Sindhi	
1984	Ishq Pecha		Urdu	
1985	Akhri Chattan		Urdu	
1992	Shehzada		Urdu	
1994	Aitraaf		Urdu	
1997	Babar	Shiwani Khan	Urdu	
	Malka e Alam		Urdu	
	Pul Siraat	"Farrukh"	Urdu	
2012	Aks		Urdu	
2013	Mere Harjai		Urdu	
2013	Adhoori Aurat		Urdu	
2013	Meri Maa	Sultan	Urdu	
2014	Bashar Momin	Bakhtiyar	Urdu	
2014	Khushaal Susral		Urdu	
2014	Sultanat-e-Dil		Urdu	
2015	Anaya Tumhari Hui	Ejaz Ahmed	Urdu	
2015	Sada Sukhi Raho		Urdu	
2015	Mujhe Kuch Kehna Hai		Urdu	
2016	Jhoot	Farooq	Urdu	
2016	Thora Sa Aasman	Masood	Urdu	
2016	Rishta Anjana Se		Urdu	
2017	Dil-e-Jaanam	Azeem	Urdu	
2017	Ek Hi Bhool	Waqar	Urdu	
2017	Shaadi Mubarak Ho		Urdu	
2017	Hina Ki Khushboo	Samad	Urdu	
2017	Mera Haq	Zaheer	Urdu	
2018	Silsilay		Urdu	
2020	Mohabbat Khel Tamasha	Akbar Khan	Urdu	
