= Field of view in video games =

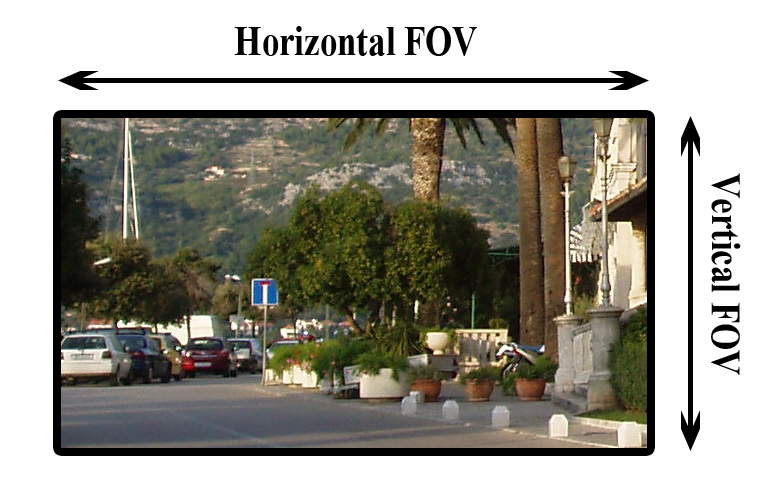
A field of view

In video games, the field of view or field of vision (abbreviated FOV) is the extent of the observable game world that is seen on the display at any given moment. It is typically measured as an angle, although whether this angle is the horizontal, vertical, or diagonal component of the field of view varies from game to game.

The FOV in a video game may change depending on the aspect ratio of the rendering resolution. In computer games and modern game consoles the FOV normally increases with a wider aspect ratio of the rendering resolution.

== Field of view calculations ==
90 degrees FOV in a video game

The field of view is usually given as an angle for the horizontal or vertical component of the FOV. A larger angle indicates a larger field of view. However, depending on the FOV scaling method used by the game, it may only affect the horizontal or the vertical component of the field of view.

The horizontal and vertical FOV are calculated from the following equations:

$r = {w \over h} = \frac{\tan \left({H \over 2}\right) }{ \tan \left({V \over 2}\right)}$

$H = 2 \arctan \left( \tan \left({V \over 2}\right) \times {w \over h} \right)$

$V = 2 \arctan \left( \tan \left({H \over 2}\right) \times {h \over w} \right)$

where r is the aspect ratio, w and h are the width and height, and H and V are the horizontal and vertical FOV.

The different values for horizontal and vertical FOV may lead to confusion because the games often just mention FOV and not whether they mean the horizontal or vertical FOV.

== Choice of field of view ==
Including peripheral vision, the visual field of the average person is approximately 170–180 degrees. Console games are usually played on a TV at a large distance from the viewer, while PC games are usually played on computer monitors close to the viewer. Therefore, a narrow FOV of around 60 degrees is used for console games as the screen subtends a small part of the viewer's visual field, and a larger FOV of 90 to 100 degrees is usually set for PC games as the screen occupies a larger amount of the viewer's vision.

Narrowing the field of view can be a technique used to improve performance, as it can allow you to have to render less objects through the common optimisation technique of viewing-frustum culling.

Many PC games that are released after 2000 are ported from consoles, or developed for both console and PC platforms. Ideally, the developer will set a wider FOV in the PC release, or offer a setting to change the FOV to the player's preference. However, in many cases the narrow FOV of the console release is retained in the PC version. This results in an uncomfortable sensation likened to viewing the scene through binoculars, and may lead to disorientation, dizziness, or nausea.

Ratio	1080p resolution	Common name	Video format
32:27	1280 × 1080p		DVCPRO HD
4:3	1440 × 1080p		
16:10	1728 × 1080p		
16:9	1920 × 1080p	Widescreen	
2:1	2160 × 1080p	18:9	Univisium
64:27	2560 × 1080p	Ultra-Widescreen	Cinemascope / Anamorphic
32:9	3840 × 1080p	Super Ultra-Widescreen	Ultra-Widescreen 3.6

== Field of view scaling methods ==
The terms Hor+, static (previously anamorphic), pixel-based, Vert- and stretch are widely used in gaming discussions to describe how different video games change field of view dependent on the aspect ratio of the rendering resolution. The terms were originally coined by members of the Widescreen Gaming Forum.

- Hor+ (horizontal plus) is the most common scaling method for the majority of modern video games. In games with Hor+ scaling, the vertical FOV is fixed, while the horizontal FOV is expandable depending on the aspect ratio of the rendering resolution; a wider aspect ratio results in a larger FOV. Since the majority of screens used for gaming nowadays are widescreen, this scaling method is usually preferred as wider aspect ratios do not suffer from reduced FOV with it. This becomes especially important in more "exotic" setups like ultra-wide monitor or triple-monitor gaming.

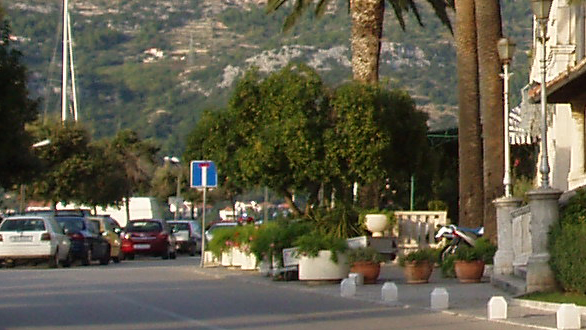
Field of view (FOV) in 16:9 video game with Hor+ scaling at 16:9

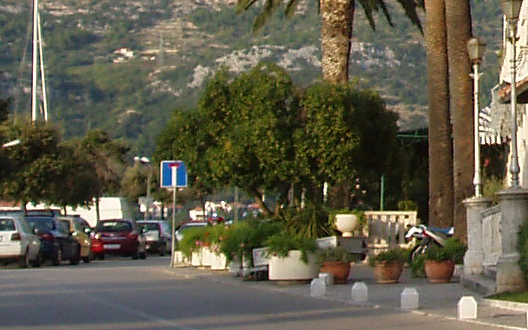
FOV in 16:9 video game with Hor+ scaling at 16:10 resolution

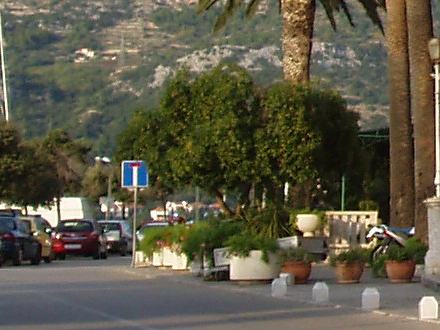
FOV in 16:9 video game with Hor+ scaling at 4:3 resolution

- Static (previously anamorphic) refers to when both the vertical and horizontal components of the FOV are fixed, typically to values comfortable on a widescreen picture, and when the resolution changes the picture is either letterboxed or pillarboxed to maintain the field of view and aspect ratio. Modern games using static scaling typically have a 16:9 aspect ratio.

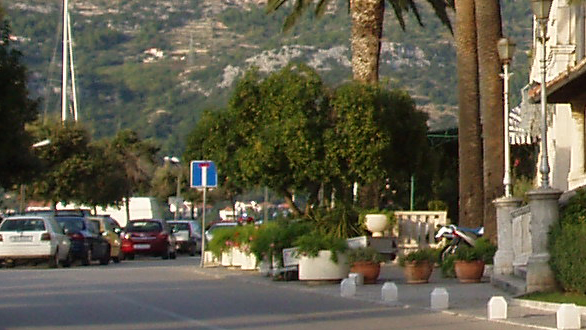
FOV in 16:9 video game with static scaling at 16:9

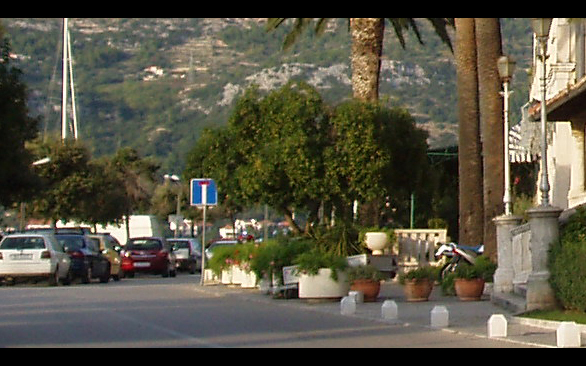
FOV in 16:9 video game with static scaling at 16:10

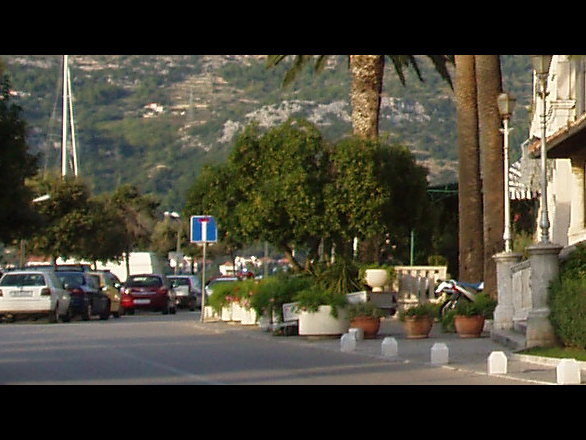
FOV in 16:9 video game with static scaling at 4:3

- Pixel-based scaling is almost exclusively used in games with two-dimensional graphics. With pixel-based scaling, the amount of content displayed on screen is directly tied to the rendering resolution. A larger horizontal resolution directly increases the horizontal field of view, and a larger vertical resolution increases the vertical field of view.
- Vert- (vertical minus) is a scaling method used by some games that support a wide variety of resolutions. In Vert- games, as the aspect ratio widens, the vertical component of the field of view is reduced to compensate. This avoids distortion of objects in the game world but results in a smaller field of view on widescreen resolutions, and may become especially problematic with extremely wide resolutions, such as those common on multiple-display setups.
- Stretch refers to a behaviour where the FOV is not adjusted at all, and the image is simply stretched to fill the screen. This method causes significant distortion if used on an aspect ratio different from the one the FOV was originally calibrated for, and is mostly found in games made when most displays had a 4:3 aspect ratio.

== Field of view as an effect ==
Temporary changes to the field of view can sometimes be used as a special effect in video games. Reducing the field of view is commonly used to convey focus, whereas widening it may increase perceived movement speed or indicate lack of control.

== See also ==
- Viewing frustum
- Field of view
- Aspect ratio
- 4:3
- 16:9 aspect ratio
- 16:10 aspect ratio
- 21:9 aspect ratio
- Angle of view
