= Haneef Shareef =

Pakistani writer (born 1976)

- حنیف شریف
- Born: 25 December 1976; Karachi, Pakistan
- Disappeared: 2005
- Occupations: Director, writer, producer, Doctor
- Years active: 1990–2005
- Children: Kandi Baloch and Banuk Turbati
- Parent(s): Mohammad Shareef, Naseema Baloch

Haneef Shareef (Balochi: حنیف شریف; born 25 December 1976) is a Pakistani Balochi language writer, film director, and producer.

He is a trained medical professional and has also been associated with the Baloch Students Organization (BSO). As a Balochi fiction writer, he has published two collections of short stories and one novel. Between 2009 and 2014, Shareef directed several popular Balochi-language films, including Balaach, Manzil, Mani Pethaa Braath Nesth, and Kareem.

On 18 November 2005 he was arrested, due to his affiliation with the BSO.

== Early life ==
Hanif Sharif was born in Karachi. He began his career as a Balochi short story writer in the 1990s.

== Filmography ==
=== Film ===
- Manzil (2007)
- Balaach (2009)
- Mani Petha Brath Nest (2012)
- Balochistan Hotel (2010)
- Karim (2014)
