= Dad Shah =

Iranian Baloch rebel active during the 1950s

Mir Dad Shah
- دادشاه
- Died: 11 January 1958
- Occupation: Farmer
- Known for: Participating in the Balochistan insurgency against the Iranian state

Mir Dad Shah (Persian: دادشاه), also spelled Mir Daad Shah, was an Iranian Baloch farmer who lived in a village called Nillag within Iranian Balochistan. With the goal of securing an independent Balochistan and largely discontent with Iranian rule, Shah participated in a rebellion and armed insurgency against the Shah of Iran, Mohammad Reza Pahlavi, in the 1950s. He was killed in action during the insurgency.

== See also ==
- Iran–Iraq War
- Insurgency in Balochistan
  - Insurgency in Sistan and Baluchestan (Iran)
  - Iran–Pakistan relations
- Dadshah – a movie based on the farmer and rebel's life
