= Dadshah =

1983 Iranian film

Daadshah
- Directed by: Habib Kavosh
- Produced by: Tasvir Donyaye Honar
- Starring: Saeed Rad, Khosrow Shakibai, Jafar Vali, Amin Rigi, Bahrami, Mohsen Rigi, Mohammad Rigi, Nader Khaki, Ahmad Aghalou, Mohammad Shiri, Sattar Ora
- Cinematography: Hasan Mohammadi
- Edited by: Roohollah Emami, Gorgin Grigorians, Homayoon Sharifi Rad
- Music by: Fereydoon Shahbazian
- Distributed by: Iran Film Industries Services
- Release date: 21 March 1984 (Iran)
- Running time: 136 minutes
- Country: Iran
- Language: Persian

Daadshah (Persian: دادشاه, romanized: Dādšāh) is a 1984 Iranian Persian-language film depicting the life and experiences of Baloch rebel Dad Shah during the Balochistan insurgency.

== Plot ==
Mir Dad Shah or Mir Daad Shah was a farmer who lived in Nillag village of Iranian Balochistan in the 1950s. He hated Mohammad Reza Pahlavi's oppressive administration which made him take up arms against the Shah. Daad Shah's wife Bibi Hatun also fought with him against his enemies. Dad Shah was supported by Iraq through local Balochi politician Mir Abdi, who went into self-exile in Iraq for his people's national struggle. Dad Shah killed tribal chief Sardar Muhammad Darani of Zahedan. Sardar Darani was the commander-in-chief of Zahedan under Reza Shah. In 1957, Daad Shah's tribal chiefs betrayed him, by calling him for negotiation where he was killed in a gun battle by Iranian Forces. Mir Abdi was persuaded by the Shah to return to Iran and given privileges to stop his struggle for Balochis. The struggle came to an end by an agreement between Iran and Iraq, where Iran stopped support for the Kurdish struggle in Iraq, while Iraq deprived the Baloch from theirs. But later Iraq gave support to Balochis secretly till the 1980s, when the Iran–Iraq War began Balochi groups were given large amount of support in financial and weapons.
