= 16:10 aspect ratio =

Aspect ratio for computer displays

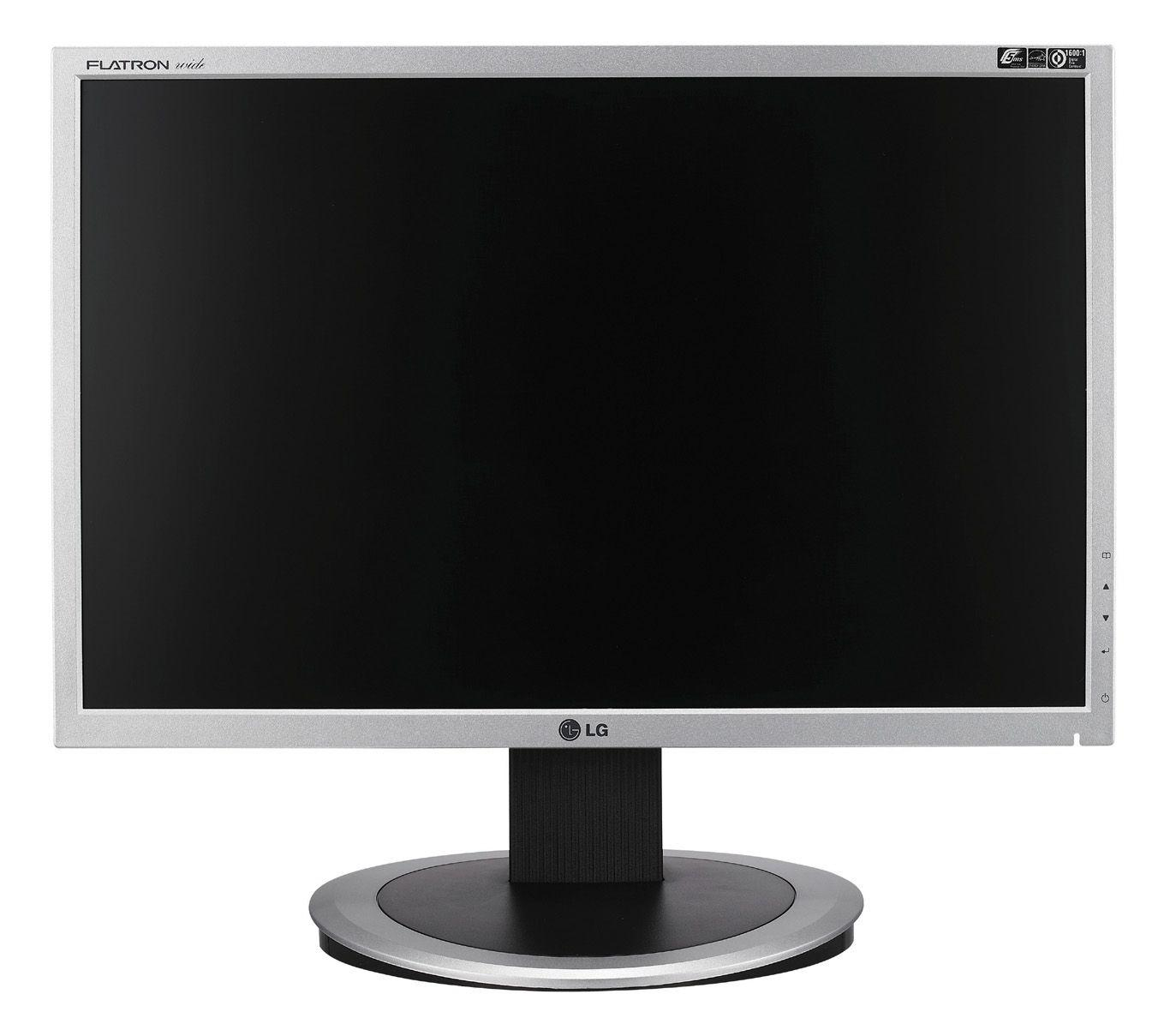
An LG 19-inch LCD monitor with an aspect ratio of 16:10

16:10 (1.6:1), also known as the equivalent 8:5, is an aspect ratio commonly used for computer displays and tablet computers. It is equal to 8/5, close to the golden ratio ($\varphi$), which is approximately 1.618. Video editing applications are commonly designed to allow editing of 16:9 content with the editing interface occupying the lower tenth of the display, allowing editing using a single display with the video occupying the full width.

== History ==
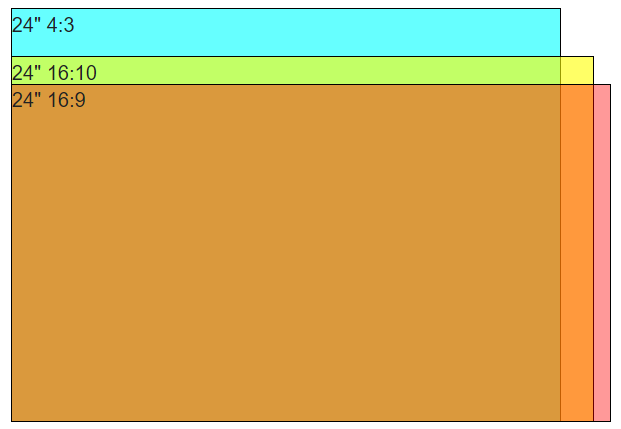
Aspect ratio comparison. 16:9 became the HD video standard.

LCD computer displays with a 16:10 ratio first rose to mass market prominence in 2001. By 2008, the 16:10 aspect ratio had become the most common aspect ratio for LCD monitors and laptop displays. After 2010, 16:9 became the mainstream standard. This shift was driven by lower manufacturing costs and the 16:9 aspect ratio being used as a standard in modern televisions. Since 2020, there has been a resurgence in the adoption of 16:10, with almost all new laptops sold in 2026 featuring the aspect ratio, and it also being a common aspect ratio for the displays of handheld gaming consoles such as the Steam Deck.

=== Rise in popularity from 2001 ===
Until about 2001, most computer monitors had a 4:3 aspect ratio, with some using a 5:4 ratio. Between 2001 and 2006, monitors with 16:10 aspect ratios became commonly available, first in laptops, and later in display monitors. Such displays were considered better suited for word processing and computer-aided design.

From 2005 to 2008, 16:10 overtook 4:3 as the highest-selling aspect ratio for LCD monitors. At the time, 16:10 made up 90% of the notebook market, and was the most commonly used aspect ratio for laptops. However, 16:10 had a short reign as the most common aspect ratio.

=== Decline from 2008 ===
Around 2008–2010, computer display manufacturers began a rapid shift to the 16:9 aspect ratio. By 2011, 16:10 had almost disappeared from new mass-market products. By October 2012, the market share of 16:10 displays had dropped to less than 23%, according to Net Applications.

The primary reason for this move was considered to be production efficiency: Since display panels for TVs use the 16:9 aspect ratio, it became more efficient for display manufacturers to produce computer display panels in the same aspect ratio. A 2008 report by DisplaySearch also cited several other reasons, including the ability for PC and monitor manufacturers to expand their product ranges by offering products with wider screens and higher resolutions. This helped consumers adopt such products more easily, "stimulating the growth of the notebook PC and LCD monitor market".

The shift from 16:10 to 16:9 was met with a mixed response. The lower cost of 16:9 computer displays was seen as a positive, along with their suitability for gaming and movies, as well as the convenience of having the same aspect ratio in different devices. On the other hand, there was criticism towards the lack of vertical screen real estate when compared to 16:10 displays of the same screen diagonal. For this reason, some consider 16:9 displays less suitable for productivity-oriented tasks, such as editing documents or spreadsheets and using design or engineering applications, which are mostly designed for taller, rather than wider screens.

=== Resurgence from 2020 ===
Throughout the 2010s, virtually no consumer monitors or notebook computers were using the 16:10 ratio, with exceptions for major laptop OEMs Apple (who continued use of 16:10 on their MacBook lineup), and Microsoft (who adopted the even taller 3:2 ratio for their Surface products). In late 2019, Dell released an updated convertible model of their popular XPS 13 productivity laptop that moved away from the 16:9 aspect ratio to 16:10, using a new display panel developed with Sharp Corporation. Dell also made the change to their standard XPS 13 notebook offering in 2020.

The XPS 13 influenced a number of other OEMs to start offering portable computers in 16:10 (or 3:2) ratio as opposed to 16:9 in 2020 and 2021, including Acer Swift 3, LG Gram, Asus ProArt Studiobook, HP's 16-inch Spectre x360, and even gaming computers. By 2024, much of the computer industry was once again making use of 16:10 ratio displays. In late 2021, Apple's MacBook changed to slightly taller 1.54:1 (16:10.4) and 1.55:1 (16:10.3) ratios for the 14-inch and 16-inch models respectively.

The rise of handheld gaming consoles like the Steam Deck also bought about 16:10 as a commonly used aspect ratio.

== On tablets ==
Tablets started to enjoy mainstream popularity beginning late 2010/early 2011 and remain popular to the present day. Aspect ratios for tablets typically include 16:10, 16:9, 3:2, and 4:3. Tablets have caused a shift in production away from purely 16:9 aspect ratios and a resurgence of "productivity" aspect ratios (such as 16:10, 3:2 and 4:3) in place of "media" aspect ratios (16:9 and ultra-widescreen formats). The format remains widely popular in the TV and smartphone industries, where it is more suited.

Many Android tablets have a 16:10 aspect ratio, because the 16:10 aspect ratio better suited for reading books compared to 16:9, and many papers have an aspect ratio closer to 16:10 than 16:9 (e.g., ISO 216 papers use the 1:√2 ≈ 1:1.414 aspect ratio), and books commonly also use aspect ratios of 1:1.5 and 1:1.6. Apple's different iPad models use aspect ratios of either 4:3 on larger iPads, or close to 3:2 on smaller iPads, for similar reasons.

== Common resolutions ==
This is a list of common resolutions with the 16:10 aspect ratio:

Standard	Width	Height
WXGA	1280	800
WXGA+	1440	900
WSXGA+	1680	1050
WUXGA	1920	1200
WQXGA	2560	1600
WQXGA+	2880	1800
WQUXGA	3840	2400

== See also ==
- Display aspect ratio
- Aspect ratio (image)
- Computer display standard
