= Univisium =

Universal film format

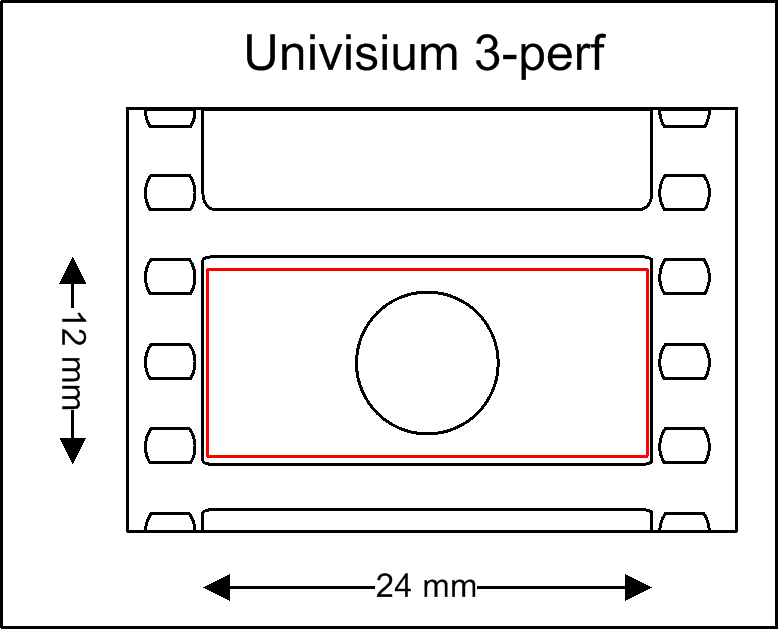
The Univisium 3-perf film proposed format frame

Univisium (macaronic Latin for "unity of images") is a proposed universal film format created by cinematographer Vittorio Storaro, ASC, AIC and his son, Fabrizio, to unify all future theatrical and television films into one respective aspect ratio of 2:1.

== Predecessors ==
The 2:1 aspect ratio was first used in the 1950s (April 1, 1953) for one of the two flat formats that Universal Pictures developed (alongside 1.85:1), the RKO Superscope format, and as an option in several other cinematographic formats. Another predecessor is Toho's Toho Pan Scope, used in the 1958 kaiju film Varan the Unbelievable and the 1957 Japanese re-release of Godzilla, King of the Monsters! (which in turn was the American localization of 1954's Godzilla), using an anamorphic process similar to Superscope with film shot in flat monochrome being cropped to 2:1 during editing.

== The main proposal ==
In 1998, cinematographer Vittorio Storaro announced his plans for a new film format, originally to be called Univision, in an interview with International Photographer magazine. As Storaro stated in his written proposal, "Recently, any movie – no matter how big or small, successful or not – will, after a very short life on the big screen, have a much longer life on an electronic screen. Today the answer print is made for both of these two different media. ...Having these two different media, with essentially two different aspect ratios, each of us (directors, production designers, cinematographers, camera Operators, etc.) shares the nightmare of compromising the composition of the Image. Looking through a viewfinder, a camera, or a monitor, we are always faced with at least two images of the same subject."

Storaro feels in the future of cinema, films will be photographed in either high-definition video for small, intimate digital projection theaters, or in 65 mm for "big audience... large screen" films. In the cinematographer's opinion, as all films will be one of the two formats, he suggests that a common aspect ratio compromise of 2.00:1 (mathematical average of 65 mm 2.20:1 and HD 1.78:1) be adopted for all films, 65 mm theatrical, HD theatrical and television.

As he told American Cinematographer writer Bob Fisher, "I believe it is very important for audiences to see films exactly the way they were composed by the director and cinematographer. This is a solution."

== 35 mm Univisium camera proposal ==
A simulated strip of 35 mm film in the proposed Univisium 2.00:1 3-perf format with two digital soundtracks present. At far left and far right, outside the perforations, is the SDDS soundtrack as an image of a digital signal. Between the perforations (on the left side) is the Dolby Digital soundtrack (note the tiny Dolby "Double D" logo in the center of each area between the perforations).

Storaro recognized that ubiquitous HD origination was not yet viable and therefore proposed an alteration to standard 35 mm photography to create a 2.00:1 aspect ratio and economize on film.

By using a negative area similar to that of the Super 35 frame (which utilizes the full width of a 35 mm film frame "perf-to-perf" as opposed to traditional 35 mm which utilizes a smaller area of the 35 mm frame offset to the right to accommodate space for an optical soundtrack) combined with 3-perf frame size (as opposed to standard 35 mm photography which uses four perforations per frame). The Univisium camera would use an aperture opening of 24mm × 12mm (.945" × .472") and three perforations per frame, which would eliminate the waste associated with 2.40:1 Super 35 mm photography (wherein nearly 50% of the frame is discarded) by creating a natural 2.00:1 aspect ratio utilizing the whole film area.

In addition to using the full film area, using three perforations per frame as opposed to four equates to using 25% less film for the same shooting time. With the traditional four perforations per frame, 35 mm film (at 24 frames per second) runs at 90 feet per minute (4 minutes 26 seconds per 400 feet of film), three perforations per frame runs at 67.5 feet per minute (5 minutes 56 seconds per 400 feet of film). This would mean each magazine of film would have 33% more shooting time and a production that shot the same overall length of time as a four-perforation film would use 25% less film.

The proposal also points out that the 2.00:1 aspect ratio can be achieved using standard spherical lenses, which, compared to their anamorphic counterparts, are cheaper, faster (require less light), and have more photographic depth of field and less visual imperfections. There is also a greater selection of spherical prime and zoom lenses than there are anamorphic lenses.

3-perf also results in a quieter camera than 4-perf as there is less intermittent movement per frame.

The format also calls for shooting 25 frames per second, which eliminates problems associated with transferring film to video in the PAL and SECAM system and is still fairly simple to transfer to the NTSC video format.

=== 35 mm Univisium projection proposal ===
Storaro suggests a renovation to standard film projectors to present a 3-perf frame and eliminate the need for an anamorphic print to be made (to optically squeeze the 2:1 3-perf aspect ratio into a 1.33:1 4-perf frame). As the image will fill the full film area (perf-to-perf) there is no room for a traditional optical soundtrack and Univisium requires two digital soundtracks, one for backup (which resides outside of the perforations on the edge of the film; DTS, Sony Dynamic Digital Sound, Dolby Digital). The projectors would run at 25 frames per second, just as the cameras do.

As a compromise to standard technology (for the time being), Storaro says an anamorphic print can be made and presented in 24 frames per second with a digital and/or optical soundtrack.

However, with the rise of the DCP (Digital Cinema Package), the 2:1 image can be projected from a flat (1.85:1) container in either 2K (1998 × 999) or 4K (3996 × 1998), with mild letterboxing.

== Univisium in use ==
Although no film has utilized the full aspects of the proposal, particularly with regard to the projection standards, Storaro has since used Univisium for nearly all of his films.

Technovision and Clairmont Cameras have altered Arriflex 435 and 535B cameras for use on Storaro films that use Univisium and 3-perf pull-down. Technicolor laboratories in Rome, London, and Los Angeles also have the means to support the Univisium format.

- Tango (1998)
- Décadence (1998)
- Goya in Bordeaux (1999)
- Picking Up the Pieces (2000)
- Frank Herbert's Dune (2000)
- Exorcist: The Beginning (2004)
- The Polar Express (2004; IMAX Version)
- Zapata: El sueño del héroe (2004)
- Dominion: Prequel to the Exorcist (2005)
- Fair Trade (2006) – First Univisium film not shot by Vittorio Storaro
- Caravaggio (2007)
- The Chronicles of Narnia: Prince Caspian (2008)
- Harry Potter and the Half-Blood Prince (2009)
- Something Evil, Something Dangerous: New Moon Rising (2011)
- The Hobbit Trilogy (2012–2014; IMAX 3D Versions IMAX 3D 70mm only for The Desolation of Smaug)
- House of Cards (2013)
- Transparent (2014)
- Transformers: Age of Extinction (2014; IMAX 3D Version; some shots)
- Jurassic World (2015)
- Crouching Tiger, Hidden Dragon: Sword of Destiny (2016; Netflix)
- Transit Havana (2016)
- Café Society (2016)
- The Girl with All the Gifts (2016)
- The Crown (2016)
- Travelers (2016)
- Stranger Things (2016)
- 20th Century Women (2016)
- A Series of Unfortunate Events (2017)
- The Book of Henry (2017)
- Dark (2017)
- Transformers: The Last Knight (2017; most shots)
- Mark Felt: The Man Who Brought Down the White House (2017)
- Wonder Wheel (2017)
- Star Trek: Discovery (2017)
- Doctor Who (2018 season onwards)
- Altered Carbon (2018)
- José José, el príncipe de la canción (2018)
- Trust (2018)
- Yellowstone (2018)
- Hereditary (2018)
- 13 Reasons Why (2018 season)
- Bloodline (2018)
- A Simple Favor (2018)
- Green Book (2018; first winner of the Academy Award for Best Picture to use the aspect ratio)
- Watership Down (2018)
- If Beale Street Could Talk (2018)
- Hanna (2019)
- Backdraft 2 (2019)
- Brigada Costa del Sol (2019)
- Chernobyl (2019)
- Murder Mystery (2019)
- Men in Black: International (2019)
- Midsommar (2019)
- Nancy Drew (2019)
- Battle at Big Rock (2019; short film)
- A Rainy Day in New York (2019)
- Jack Ryan (2019; season 2)
- The Morning Show (2019)
- Last Christmas (2019)
- Lady and the Tramp (2019)
- The Knight Before Christmas (2019)
- Servant (2019)
- Crash Landing on You (2019)
- Peaky Blinders (2019–2022; Seasons 5 and 6)
- Togo (2019)
- Dolemite Is My Name (2019)
- Alice in Borderland (2020)
- Miss Fisher and the Crypt of Tears (2020)
- Spenser Confidential (2020)
- Stargirl (2020)
- I Know This Much Is True (2020)
- Love, Victor (2020)
- Work It (2020)
- Project Power (2020)
- The Broken Hearts Gallery (2020)
- Rifkin's Festival (2020)
- Secret Society of Second-Born Royals (2020)
- Trying (2020)
- Hubie Halloween (2020)
- The Flight Attendant (2020)
- Another Round (2020)
- Rifkin's Festival (2020)
- The Great (2020)
- Godmothered (2020)
- Selena: The Series (2020)
- Casualty (2020) (starting from series 34 episode 43)
- Malory Towers (2020–present)
- Finding Alice (2021)
- Vincenzo (2021)
- Coming 2 America (2021)
- All Is Vanity (2021)
- Mare of Easttown (2021)
- Yes Day (2021)
- Vacation Friends (2021)
- Oslo (2021)
- Awake (2021)
- Jurassic World Dominion prologue (2021; short film)
- Hometown Cha-Cha-Cha (2021)
- Squid Game (2021)
- Muppets Haunted Mansion (2021)
- Clifford the Big Red Dog (2021)
- American Horror Story: Double Feature (2021)
- Impeachment: American Crime Story (2021)
- And Just Like That… - A New Chapter of Sex and the City (2021)
- A Castle for Christmas (2021)
- Everything Everywhere All at Once (2022; some scenes)
- Better Nate Than Ever (2022)
- The Northman (2022)
- House of the Dragon (2022)
- Jurassic World Dominion (2022)
- Smile (2022)
- The School for Good and Evil (2022)
- Blockbuster (2022)
- Fantasy Football (2022)
- Mars Express (2023)
- Barbie (2023)
- Coup de chance (2023)
- Class Act (2023)
- El Conde (2023)
- Five Nights at Freddy's (2023)
- The Flash (2023, ninth season)
- One Piece (2023)
- Good Burger 2 (2023)
- The Idol (2023)
- Am I OK? (2024)
- Look Back (2024)
- Megalopolis (2024)
- The Penguin (2024)
- Smile 2 (2024)
- Moana 2 (2024)
- The Family Approach (2024)
- The Monkey (2025)
- Project Hail Mary (2026, space scenes when presented in non-IMAX venues)
- The Great Collapse (2026)

Additionally, Storaro has reframed many of his earlier widescreen releases for the 2.00:1 ratio upon DVD release, including Apocalypse Now, Reds, and The Last Emperor. This has proved controversial with many film enthusiasts, who believe that regardless of Storaro's attempt to unify all aspect ratios, films should be viewed in the ratio they were filmed in, without any cropping. Due to this backlash, Apocalypse Now and Reds use their original aspect ratios for Blu-ray release, and The Last Emperor uses its original aspect ratio for its 4k UHD edition.

Other films that were reframed in open matte to the Univisium aspect ratio on DVD include the 1998 DVD release of Top Gun (1986), the 1999 & 2004 DVDs of Star Trek VI: The Undiscovered Country (1991), and the original DVD release of Austin Powers: International Man of Mystery (1997).

The HDTV version of Halloween (1978) is cropped to the Univisium aspect ratio.

Some earlier digital TV broadcasts of Star Wars, The Empire Strikes Back, and Return of the Jedi were cropped to the Univisium aspect ratio.

The VHS version of Kung Pow! Enter the Fist (2002) is cropped to the Univisium aspect ratio.

Some later LaserDisc prints and earlier DVD prints of select Studio Ghibli films such as My Neighbor Totoro and Spirited Away may be cropped to the Univisium aspect ratio from their original 1.85:1 presentation. Later remastered releases on Blu-ray and on streaming services are presented in the proper 1.85:1 aspect ratio.

Many trailers of upcoming films from 20th Century Studios that are shot in the 2.39:1 aspect ratio are cropped to this format when they play ahead of any movies that were shot in 1.85:1.

According to IMDB technical specification statistics, there are over 700 titles with 2:1 aspect ratios, and the number has been growing in recent years. Most films and TV shows that originate on streaming platforms are shot this way, although a small number of theatrical feature films use it.

Netflix production and post-production requirements state that they prefer content up to 2:1 aspect ratio; anything wider must be evaluated and discussed.

=== Aspect ratio used in music videos ===
- Fergie: "Big Girls Don't Cry" (2007)
- Ludacris feat. Justin Bieber: "Baby" (2010)
- Miranda Cosgrove: "Kissin U" (2010)
- Girls' Generation: "Hoot" (2010)
- Pitbull featuring Flo Rida and LunchMoney Lewis: "Greenlight" (2016)
- Cidergirl: "Melancholy" (2017)
- Imagine Dragons: "Thunder" (2017)
- Jason Mraz featuring Meghan Trainor: "More than Friends" (2018)
- Massari featuring Maya Diab and French Montana: "Ya Nour El Ein" (2018)
- Shawn Mendes and Camila Cabello: "Señorita" (2019)
- The Weeknd: "Heartless" (2019)
- Megan Thee Stallion feat. Nicki Minaj & Ty Dolla Sign: "Hot Girl Summer" (2019)
- Mariah Carey: "All I Want for Christmas Is You" (Make My Wish Come True Edition) (2019)
- Grace VanderWaal: "Today and Tomorrow (From Disney's Stargirl)" (2020)
- Fromis 9: "Feel Good (SECRET CODE)" (2020)
- Lauv and Conan Gray: "Fake" (2020)
- Dua Lipa featuring DaBaby, Madonna and Missy Elliott: "Levitating (The Blessed Madonna Remix)" (2020)
- Ariana Grande: "Positions" (2020)
- Hot Issue: "Gratata" (2021)
- Rich Brian: "Sydney" (2021)
- Hiba Tawaji: "Habibi Khalas" (2023)
- Chappell Roan: "HOT TO GO" (2023)
- Magic System featuring Yemi Alade, Mohamed Ramadan: "Akwaba" (2023)
- LIN, Faravaz, Sookee, Hanie: "Jin* Jiyan Azadi" (2024)
- Taylor Swift: "Patient Zero" (2026)

=== Aspect ratio used in devices ===
Some mobile devices, such as the Huawei Mate 10 Pro, LG G6, LG V30, Google Pixel 2 XL, OnePlus 5T, Sony Xperia XZ2 Compact and Xiaomi Mi Max 3, use the 2:1 format (marketed as 18:9), although the aspect ratio had been used previously in 2000s devices such as the Nokia 7710.

=== Aspect ratio used in video games ===
The 1998 game Metal Gear Solid used the Univisium aspect ratio for its cutscenes, while the game itself is in a 1.43:1 aspect ratio slightly letterboxed in a 4:3 screen. The 2017 game Sonic Forces used the Univisium aspect ratio for its cutscenes, both in-game and pre-rendered while the game itself is in 16:9. The 2013 game Ni no Kuni: Wrath of the White Witch also used the Univisium aspect ratio for select in-game cutscenes, though most of the in-game cutscenes were in 16:9, while the full motion video traditional animation cutscenes were in 1.85:1; the gameplay is in 16:9.

== See also ==
- 3-perf
- List of film formats
- Super 35
- LG G6, the first Android smartphone to use this aspect ratio for its display
