= Active Format Description =

Standard set of codes for television or set-top-box decoders

In television technology, Active Format Description (AFD) is a standard set of codes that can be sent in the MPEG video stream or in the baseband SDI video signal that carries information about their aspect ratio and other active picture characteristics. It has been used by television broadcasters to enable both 4:3 and 16:9 television sets to optimally present pictures transmitted in either format. It has also been used by broadcasters to dynamically control how down-conversion equipment formats widescreen 16:9 pictures for 4:3 displays.

Standard AFD codes provide information to video devices about where in the coded picture the active video is and also the "protected area" which is the area that needs to be shown. Outside the protected area, edges at the sides or the top can be removed without the viewer missing anything significant. Video decoders and display devices can then use this information, together with knowledge of the display shape and user preferences, to choose a presentation mode.

AFD can be used in the generation of Widescreen signaling, although MPEG alone contains enough information to generate this. AFDs are not part of the core MPEG standard; they were originally developed within the Digital TV Group in the UK and submitted to DVB as an extension, which has subsequently also been adopted by ATSC (with some changes). SMPTE has also adopted AFD for baseband SDI carriage as standard SMPTE 2016-1-2007, "Format for Active Format Description and Bar Data".

Active Format Description is occasionally incorrectly referred to as "Active Format Descriptor". There is no "descriptor" (descriptor has a specific meaning in ISO/IEC 13818-1, MPEG syntax). The AFD data is carried in the Video Layer of MPEG, ISO/IEC 13818-2. When carried in digital video, AFDs can be stored in the Video Index Information, in line 11 of the video.

By using AFDs broadcasters can also control the timing of Aspect Ratio switches more accurately than using MPEG signalling alone. This is because the MPEG signalling can only change with a new Group of Pictures in the sequence, which is typically around every 12 frames or half a second - this was not considered accurate enough for some broadcasters who were initially switching frequently between 4:3 and 16:9. The number of Aspect Ratio Converters required in a broadcast facility is also reduced, since the content is described correctly it does not need to be resized for broadcast on a platform that supports AFDs.

In 2012, a Technology & Engineering Emmy Award was awarded for the development and deployment of Active Format Description.

== Usage ==
A widescreen 16:9 signal may be broadcast with AFD 8 or AFD 10, indicating that the entire frame includes important picture information and should not be cropped. On a 4:3 TV, this will then be shown as a 16:9 letterbox to ensure no image is lost. Other widescreen 16:9 content (like sports coverage) may be broadcast with AFD 15, indicating that it is safe to display only the central 4:3 region. On a 4:3 TV, the image will be cropped and it will be shown full-screen.

As of 2006, AFDs are only broadcast in a minority of the countries using MPEG digital television but used most notably in the UK as required by the Digital TV Group D-Book. As a result, the quality of implementation in receivers is variable. Some receivers only respect the basic "active area" information. More fully featured receivers also support the "safe area" information, and will use this to optimise the display for the shape of the viewer's screen. Display in the compromise 14:9 letterbox format was not supported by initial British receivers, which limited the value of the AFD flags - this ratio is especially useful when watching widescreen material on smaller 4:3 sets.

=== AFD for the DVB DTV transition ===
The line 23 data format (compatible with the analog Widescreen signaling) allows signaling of the source (coded image) aspect ratio and the Active Format Descriptor.

Bits	Format
000	Active region same as coded frame (source material)
001	4:3
010	16:9
011	14:9
100	not used - reserved for future use
101	4:3 with shoot and protect 14:9 center
110	16 : 9 with shoot and protect 14:9 center
111	not used - reserved for future use

=== AFD for the ATSC DTV transition ===
A concerted effort on the part of US broadcasters to broadcast AFD began in 2008 in preparation for the US DTV transition which occurred on June 12, 2009.

After the DTV transition, 4:3 versions of programming are not available directly from a large percentage of US broadcasters. Cable and satellite providers down-convert 16:9 HD feeds from these broadcasters to generate the 4:3 SD versions for their SD viewers. The most common forms of down-conversion are letterbox or center-cut (cropping off the left and right sides of the 16:9 image to fit into the 4:3 raster).

Some US broadcasters transmit AFD with their HD DTV signals in order to maintain control over how SD viewers will receive their programming. With AFD included in these signals, cable and satellite providers are able to dynamically control whether HD content is to be either letterbox or center-cut for their SD viewers. However, there are cases where pay-TV providers completely disregard AFD instructions and for instance, present a 4:3 picture with widescreen elements cut off to assuage user complaints about letterboxing, on standard 4:3 sets (for instance for a secondary-market station available only in standard definition on a provider on the claim that an HD signal exists for the provider's 'primary' station for a network), to the displeasure of broadcasters.

Without AFD, either a fixed letterbox or center-cut will be required on a station-by-station basis. A fixed letterbox will result in an undesirable windowbox (i.e., a combination of letterbox and pillarbox, also called "postage stamp") effect on SD originated programming. A fixed center-cut will result in loss of important picture content on certain HD content (e.g., an HD sports broadcast containing score graphics formatted for 16:9 display).

=== Complete list of AFD codes ===
AFD codes
Decimal	Binary	ETSI / DVB	ATSC / SMPTE
0	0000	reserved	undefined
1	0001	reserved	
2	0010	16:9 active picture (top aligned)	not recommended
3	0011	14:9 active picture (top aligned)	not recommended
4	0100	box > 16:9 (center): wider than 16:9 active picture. The aspect ratio of the source area is not given, and the size of the top/bottom bars is not indicated.	bar data (indicating the extent of top, bottom, left, and right bars) should be transmitted when using this code.
5	0101	reserved	
6	0110	reserved	
7	0111	reserved	
8	1000	Full Frame image, same as the frame (4:3 or 16:9).	
9	1001	4:3 Image: Full Frame in 4:3 frame, Pillarbox in 16:9 frame.	
10	1010	16:9 Image: Letterbox in 4:3 frame, Full Frame in 16:9 frame.	
11	1011	14:9 Pillarbox/Letterbox image.	
12	1100	reserved	
13	1101	4:3 with shoot and protect 14:9 centre. The term "shoot and protect" is not explained in the standard, but means that the areas above and below the central 14:9 region of the 4:3 active picture can be trimmed without losing important detail.	
14	1110	16:9 with shoot and protect 14:9 centre. Here, the areas to the right and left of the central 14:9 region of the 16:9 active picture can be trimmed without losing important detail.	
15	1111	16:9 with shoot and protect 4:3 centre. Here, the areas to the right and left of the central 4:3 region of the 16:9 active picture can be trimmed without losing important detail.	

The following image illustrates the above codes and the resulting images as seen on 4:3, 16:9 and 21:9 displays. Green circles represent essential content, orange circles indicate optional image areas. Black areas are unused parts of the frame, i.e. bars. The red edge indicates the full frame.

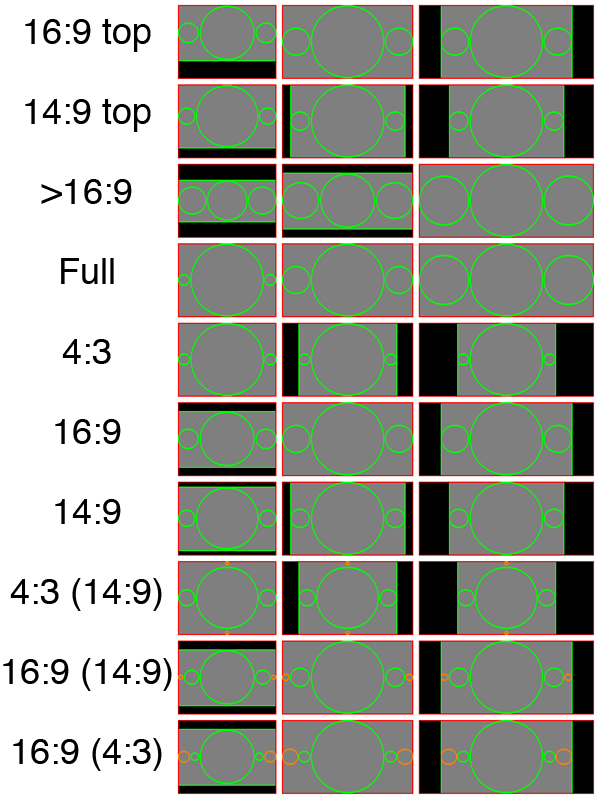

== See also ==
- Letterbox
- Shoot and protect
- Widescreen
- Widescreen signaling (WSS)
