= Pillarbox =

Black bars on the sides of an image

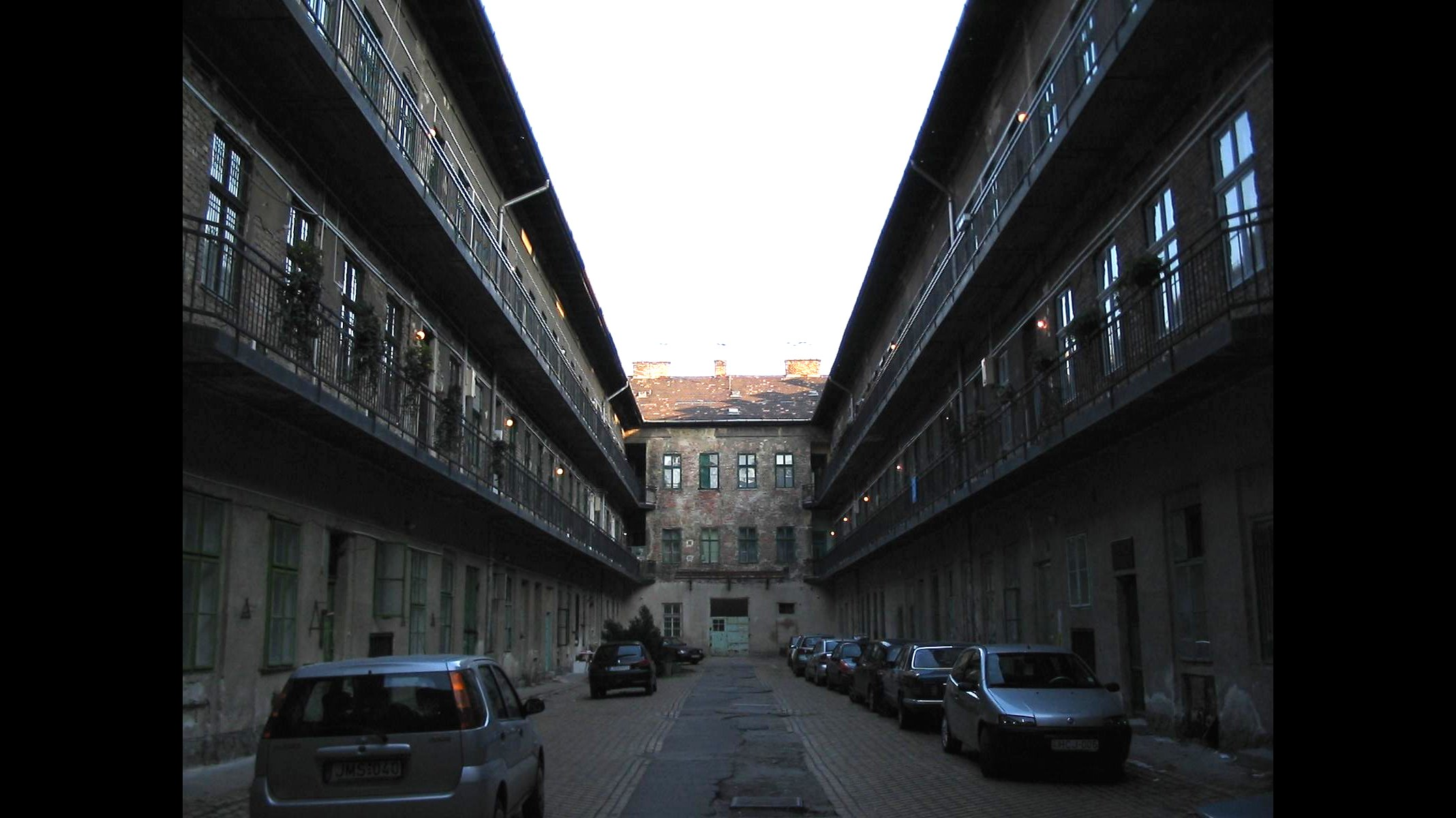
Pillarboxed image, picture taken at 4:3 aspect ratio and displayed on a 16:9 monitor

The pillarbox effect occurs in widescreen video displays when black bars (mattes or masking) are placed on the sides of the image. It becomes necessary when film or video that was not originally designed for widescreen is shown on a widescreen display, or a narrower widescreen image is displayed within a wider aspect ratio, such as a 16:9 image in a 2.39:1 frame (common in cinemas). The original material is shrunk and placed in the middle of the widescreen frame.

Some older arcade games with vertically oriented displays are shown pillarboxed, even on 4:3 televisions. Some early sound films made between 1928 and 1931, such as Sunrise: A Song of Two Humans, were released in even narrower formats such as 1.20:1 to make room for the sound-on-film track on then-standard film stock. These will appear pillarboxed even on 4:3 screens.

Pillarboxing is the vertical equivalent of (horizontal) letterboxing and goes by several names, including reverse letterboxing, curtain boxing, or postcarding. Pillarboxing is derived from its resemblance to pillar box–style mailboxes used in the UK and the Commonwealth of Nations. The four-direction equivalent is called windowboxing, caused when programming is both letterboxed and pillarboxed.

In order to use the entire screen area of a widescreen display (which already has significantly less screen area than a full-screen display of the same diagonal size), and to prevent a reverse screen burn-in on plasma displays, the simplest alternative to pillarboxing is to crop the top and bottom. However, this results in the loss of some of the image within what the producer assumed would be the safe area. This overscan may or may not bother the viewer, but it often cuts off the channel banner or other on-screen displays. Likewise, the vertical equivalent of pan and scan is called "tilt and scan" or "reverse pan and scan". This moves the cropped "window" up and down, but it is rarely done. A third option is to stretch the video to fill the screen, but this is often considered ugly, as it severely distorts everything on the screen.

Because certain screen resolutions can be used for both fullscreen and widescreen (anamorphic), widescreen signaling (such as the Active Format Description) must be used to tell the display device which to use, or the viewer must set it manually, in order to prevent unnecessary pillarboxing or stretching on widescreen displays.

== Stylized pillarboxing on television ==
Some high-definition television networks and TV stations use "stylized pillarboxing", meaning they fill in the blank areas on the sides with their HD logo or other still or motion graphics, when the program being shown is only available in 4:3 aspect ratio (standard definition).

These graphics reassure viewers that they are watching the HD version of a channel rather than the SD version, while filling the screen with imagery instead of black bars. This also tells widescreen television sets with automatic resizing not to stretch the video, and instead to present it in the proper aspect ratio (although conversely, this may cause fullscreen SDTV sets and analog cable TV headends to horizontally compress or to windowbox the video).

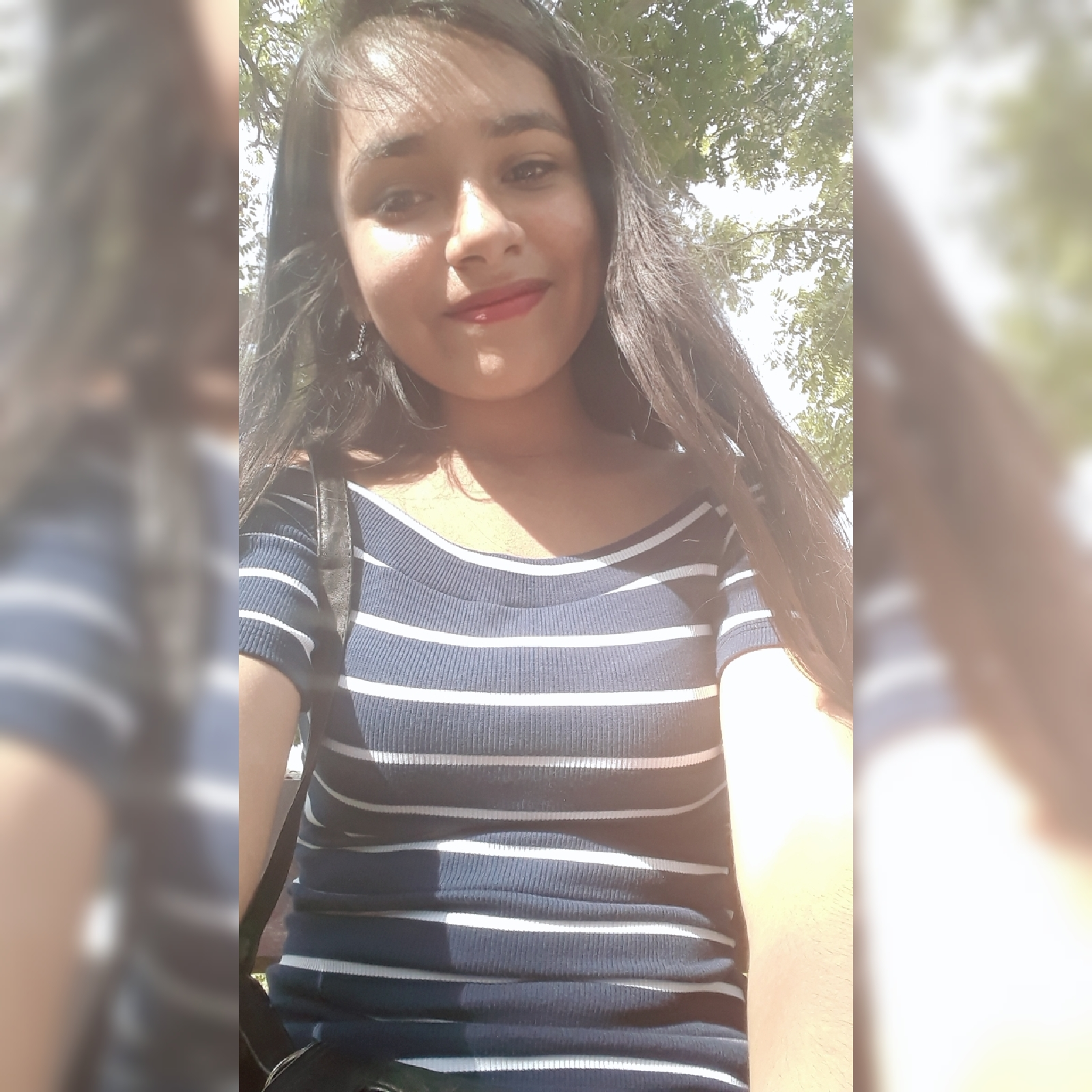
Vertical video with 'echo' pillarboxing

A limited number of local stations also apply custom pillarboxes, but most have removed them with both the advent of all-HD schedules and customer complaints about erroneous technical information in PSIP data. Some TV shows present an "echo" of the edges of the program video in the sidebars, usually blurred. Local television stations in the U.S. typically use graphics or a simple color gradient for electronic news-gathering packages shown on their local news programs. Until equipment replacement withdrew the majority of SD cameras from news organizations, portable ENG cameras were often not able to shoot in HD (due to their number and expense), though the studio cameras were in high definition.

Television news broadcasts often use echo pillarboxing when presenting portrait-oriented footage recorded on smartphones, especially eyewitness footage submitted by members of the public. Broadcasters use this technique to fill the horizontal television frame without stretching the original footage or cropping important portions of it. Computer apps such as Video Landscaper can automatically convert portrait videos into echo pillarbox landscape videos.

Some financial news channels (such as CNBC's "HD+" and the Fox Business "HD Wing") offered "enhanced" HD feeds, which were pillarboxed to one side to provide a sidebar for additional on-screen data (such as stock quotes and graphs).

Some Japanese anime switched from SD to HD during their run. Sometimes a flashback to a scene produced in SD had to be shown. For instance, in Naruto, the image of Naruto and Sasuke filled in the blank gaps as one of the SD-era flashbacks is being shown.

== See also ==
- 14:9 aspect ratio
- 16:9 aspect ratio
- Aspect ratio (image)
- Index of articles related to motion pictures
- Letterboxing (filming)
- Stretch-o-Vision
- Vertical video
- Widescreen
- Windowbox (filmmaking)
