= Widescreen signaling =

Aspect ratio signaling in an analog television signal

In television technology, Wide Screen Signaling (WSS) is digital metadata embedded in invisible part of the analog TV signal describing qualities of the broadcast, in particular the intended aspect ratio of the image. This allows television broadcasters to enable both 4:3 and 16:9 television sets to optimally present pictures transmitted in either format, by displaying them in full screen, letterbox, widescreen, pillar-box, zoomed letterbox, etc.

This development is related to introduction of widescreen TVs and broadcasts, with the PALplus system in the European Union (mid 1990s), the Clear-Vision system in Japan (early 1990s), and the need to downscale HD broadcasts to SD in the US. The bandwidth of the WSS signal is low enough to be recorded on VHS (at the time a popular home video recording technology). It is standardized on Rec. ITU-R BT.1119-2.

A modern digital equivalent would be the Active Format Description, a standard set of codes that can be sent in a MPEG video stream, with a similar set of aspect ratio possibilities.

== 625 line systems ==
For 625 line analog TV systems (like PAL or SECAM), the signal is placed in line 23. It begins with a run-in code and start code followed by 14 bits of information, divided into four groups, as shown on the tables below (based on Rec. ITU-R BT.1119-2) :

Group 1 - Aspect ratio
Bits (0 to 3)	Aspect ratio	Picture placement inside the broadcast area	Active lines
0000	-	-	-
0001	Full format 4:3		576
0010	Letterbox 16:9 top		432
0011	-	-	-
0100	Letterbox 14:9 top		504
0101	-	-	-
0110	-	-	-
0111	Full format 14:9 centre shoot and protect 14:9 (see note)		576
1000	Letterbox 14:9 centre		504
1001	-	-	-
1010	-	-	-
1011	Letterbox deeper than 16:9 centre		undefined
1100	-	-	-
1101	Letterbox 16:9 centre		432
1110	Full format 16:9 anamorphic		576
1111	-	-	-

Note: The transmitted aspect ratio is 4:3. Within this area a 14:9 window is protected, containing all the relevant picture content to allow a wide-screen display on a 16:9 television set.

Group 2 to 4
Bit	Item	Group
4	Camera Mode (interlaced) / PALplus Film Mode (progressive scan)	2 - Enhanced Services
5	Conventional PAL / PALplus Motion Adaptative Colour Plus encoding	2 - Enhanced Services
6	No Vertical helper / PALplus Vertical helper present	2 - Enhanced Services
7	Reserved / Ghost cancellation	2 - Enhanced Services
8	No subtitles / subtitles within teletext	3 - Subtitles
9	No open subtitles / Subtitles in active image area	3 - Subtitles
10	Subtitles out of active image area / Reserved	3 - Subtitles
11	No surround sound / Surround sound mode	4 - Reserved
12	No copyright asserted or status unknown / Copyright asserted	4 - Reserved
13	Copying not restricted / Copying restricted	4 - Reserved

== 525 line systems ==
525 line analog systems (like NTSC or PAL-M) made a provision for the use of pulses for signaling widescreen and other parameters, introduced with the development of Clear-Vision (EDTV-II), a NTSC-compatible Japanese system allowing widescreen broadcasts. IEC 61880 prescribes the signals to be sent in lines 22 and 285 as 27 data bits. Other sources define lines 20 and 283 for this purpose.

The following table shows the information present on the signal, based on Rec. ITU-R BT.1119-2 ("helper" signals are EDTV-II specific):

Bit	Item
1	Reference signal
2	Reference signal
3	Aspect ratio (4:3 full format / 16:9 letterbox)
4	Even parity for B3 to B5
5	Reserved
6	Field type (First field / Next field)
7	Frame type (Reference frame / Other frame)
8	Vertical temporal helper (no / yes)
9	Vertical high resolution helper (no / yes)
10	Horizontal helper (no / yes)
11	Horizontal helper pre-combing (no / yes)
12 to 14	For TV station use
15 to 17	Reserved
18 to 23	Error correction codes for B3 to B17
24	Reference signal
25 to 27	Confirmation signal

== See also ==
- PALplus
- Clear-Vision
- Active Format Description (AFD)
- Teletext
