= Anamorphic widescreen =

Technique that compresses a widescreen image onto a 4:3 frame

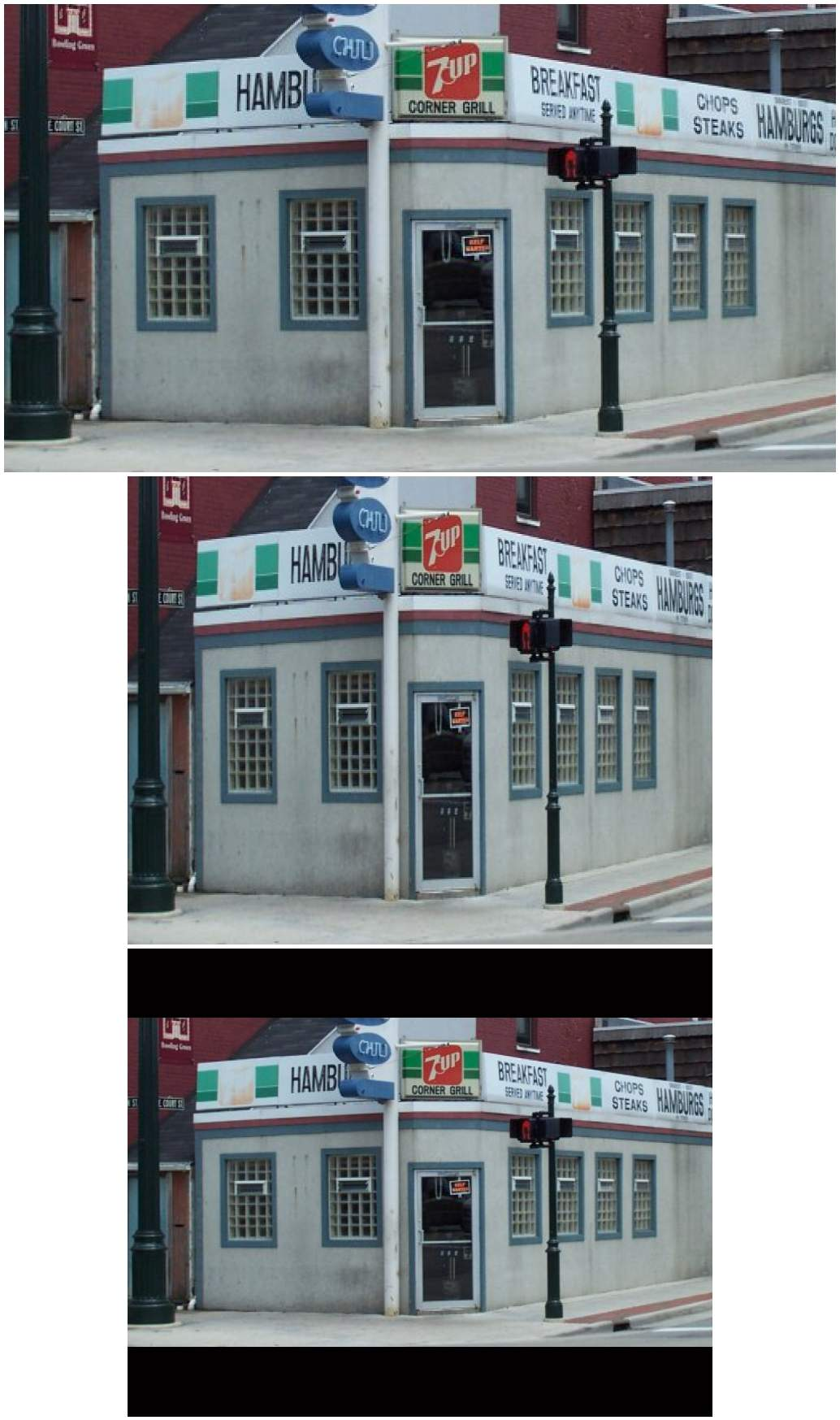
Original, Anamorphic and letterbox

Anamorphic widescreen (also called full-height anamorphic or FHA) is a process by which a widescreen image is horizontally compressed to fit into a storage medium (photographic film or MPEG-2 standard-definition frame, for example) with a narrower aspect ratio, reducing the horizontal resolution of the image while keeping its full original vertical resolution. Compatible play-back equipment (a projector with modified lens, or a digital video player or set-top box) can then expand the horizontal dimension to show the original widescreen image. This is typically used to allow one to store widescreen images on a medium that was originally intended for a narrower ratio, while using as much of the frame – and therefore recording as much detail – as possible.

The technique comes from cinema, when a film would be framed and recorded as widescreen but the picture would be "squashed together" using a special concave lens to fit into non-widescreen 1.37:1 aspect ratio film. This film can then be printed and manipulated like any other 1.37:1 film stock, although the images on it will appear to be squashed horizontally (or elongated vertically). An anamorphic lens on the projector in the cinema (a convex lens) corrects the picture by performing the opposite distortion, returning it to its original width and its widescreen aspect ratio.

The optical scaling of the lens to a film medium is considered more desirable than the digital counterpart, due to the amount of non-proportional pixel-decimated scaling that is applied to the width of an image to achieve (something of a misnomer) a so-called "rectangular" pixel widescreen image. The legacy ITU-R Rec. 601 4:3 image size is used for its compatibility with the original video bandwidth that was available for professional video devices that used fixed clock rates of a SMPTE 259M serial digital interface. One would produce a higher-quality upscaled 16:9 widescreen image by using either a 1:1 SD progressive frame size of 640×360 or for ITU-R Rec. 601 and SMPTE 259M compatibility a letterboxed frame size of 480i or 576i. Similar operations are performed electronically to allow widescreen material to be stored on formats or broadcast on systems that assume a non-widescreen aspect ratio, such as DVD or standard definition digital television broadcasting.

== Film ==
Many commercial films (especially epics – usually with the CinemaScope 2.35:1 optical sound or the older 4-track mag sound 2.55:1 aspect ratio) are recorded on standard 35 mm ~4:3 aspect ratio film, (Note: The standard 1932 Academy ratio changed the true aspect ratio of the image data to 1.375 when they made space for audio tracks, however, this is close enough to 4:3 that the difference is often glossed over.) using an anamorphic lens to horizontally compress all footage into a ~4:3 frame. Another anamorphic lens on the movie theater projector corrects (optically decompresses) the picture (see anamorphic format for details). Other movies (often with aspect ratios of 1.85:1 in the USA or 1.66:1 in Europe) are made using the simpler matte technique, which involves both filming and projecting without any expensive special lenses. The movie is produced in 1.375 format, and then the resulting image is simply cropped in post-production (or perhaps in the theater's projector) to fit the desired aspect ratio of 1.85:1 or 1.66:1 or whatever is desired. Besides costing less, the main advantage of the matte technique is that it leaves the studio with "real" footage (the areas that are cropped for the theatrical release) which can be used in preference to pan and scan when producing 4:3 DVD releases, for example.

The anamorphic encoding on DVD is related to the anamorphic filming technique (like CinemaScope) only by name. For instance, Star Wars (1977) was filmed in 2.39:1 ratio using an anamorphic camera lens, and shown in theaters using the corresponding projector lens. Since it is a widescreen film, when encoded on a widescreen-format DVD the studio would almost certainly use the anamorphic encoding process. Monty Python and the Holy Grail was filmed in 1.85:1 ratio without using an anamorphic lens on the camera, and similarly was shown in theaters without the need for the decompression lens. However, since it is also a widescreen film, when encoded on a widescreen-format DVD the studio would probably use the anamorphic encoding process.

It does not matter whether the filming was done using the anamorphic lens technique: as long as the source footage is intended to be widescreen, the digital anamorphic encoding procedure is appropriate for the DVD release. As a sidenote, if a purely non-widescreen version of the analog-anamorphic Star Wars were to be released on DVD, the only options would be pan and scan or hardcoded 4:3 letterboxing (with the black letterboxes actually encoded as part of the DVD data).

== Laserdisc ==
While not anamorphic widescreen per se, many of the earliest Laserdisc offerings forwent the pan-and-scan cropping typical of home releases at the time, the mastering-technicians opting instead to simply squeeze the film's original aspect ratio down to 4:3. While this resulted in an image that was overly compressed on standard televisions, many later HDTVs can stretch out this picture, thus restoring the correct aspect ratio.

Later during the 1990s, a handful of Laserdiscs were released with proper anamorphic transfers. Video was stretched vertically to fill the whole 4:3 picture of a Laserdisc (and add more information where black bars would be at the top and bottom) then either un-squeezed horizontally on a 16:9 TV set or using an anamorphic lens on a 4:3 video projector.

== DVD Video ==
A DVD labeled as "Anamorphic Widescreen" contains video that has the same frame size in pixels as traditional fullscreen video, but uses wider pixels. The shape of the pixels is called pixel aspect ratio and is encoded in the video stream for a DVD player to correctly identify the proportions of the video. If an anamorphic DVD video is played on standard 4:3 television without adjustment, the image will look horizontally squeezed. The menus are also anamorphic.

=== Packaging ===
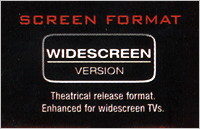
Pre-2001 MGM Anamorphic Widescreen DVD packaging sample.

Universal Anamorphic Widescreen DVD packaging sample. Also used by DreamWorks Home Entertainment and Sony Pictures Home Entertainment.

Although currently there is no labeling standard, DVDs with content originally produced in an aspect ratio wider than 1.33:1 are typically labeled "Anamorphic Widescreen", "Enhanced for 16:9 televisions", "Enhanced for widescreen televisions", or similar. If not so labeled, the DVD is intended for a 4:3 display ("fullscreen"), and will be letterboxed or panned and scanned.

There has been no clear standardization for companies to follow regarding the advertisement of anamorphically enhanced widescreen DVDs. Some companies, such as Universal and Disney, include the aspect ratio of the movie.

== Blu-ray video ==
Unlike DVD, Blu-ray supports SMPTE HD resolutions of 720p and 1080i/p with a display aspect ratio of 16:9 and a pixel aspect ratio of 1:1, so widescreen video is scaled non-anamorphically (this is referred to as "square" pixels).

Blu-ray also supports anamorphic widescreen, both at the DVD-Video/D-1 resolutions of 720×480 (NTSC) and 720×576 (PAL), and at the higher resolution of 1440×1080 (source aspect ratio of 4:3, hence a pixel aspect ratio of 4:3 = 16:9 / 4:3 when used as anamorphic 16:9). See Blu-ray Disc: Technical specifications for details.

== Television ==
Major digital television channels in Europe (for example, the five major UK terrestrial TV channels of BBC One, BBC Two, ITV, Channel 4 and Channel 5), as well as Australia, carry anamorphic widescreen programming in standard definition. In almost all cases, 4:3 programming is also transmitted on the same channel. The SCART switching signal can be used by a set-top-box to signal the television which kind of programming (4:3 or anamorphic) is currently being received, so that the television can change modes appropriately. The user can often elect to display widescreen programming in a 4:3 letterbox format instead of pan and scan if they do not have a widescreen television.

TV stations and TV networks can also include Active Format Description (AFD) just as DVDs can. Many ATSC tuners (integrated or set-top box) can be set to respond to this, or to apply a user setting. This can sometimes be set on a per-channel basis, and often on a per-input basis, and usually easily with a button on the remote control. However, tuners often fail to allow this on SDTV (480i-mode) channels, so that viewers are forced to view a small picture instead of cropping the unnecessary sides (which are outside of the safe area), or zooming to eliminate the windowboxing that may be causing a small picture, or stretching/compressing to eliminate other format-conversion errors. The shrunken pictures are especially troublesome for smaller TV sets.

Many modern HDTV sets have the capability to detect black areas in any video signal, and to smoothly re-scale the picture independently in both directions (horizontal and vertical) so that it fills the screen. However, some sets are 16:10 (1.6:1) like some computer monitors, and will not crop the left and right edges of the picture, meaning that all programming looks slightly (though usually imperceptibly) tall and thin.

ATSC allows two anamorphic widescreen SDTV formats (interlaced and progressive scan) which are 704×480 (10% wider than 640×480); this is narrower than the 720×480 of DVD due to 16 pixels being consumed by overscan (nominal analogue blanking) – see overscan: analog to digital resolution issues. The format can also be used for fullscreen programming, and in this case it is anamorphic with pixels slightly taller (10:11, or 0.91:1) than their width.

== See also ==
- Anamorphic film format
- Anamorphosis
- Aspect ratio
- Letterbox
- Pan and scan
- Shoot and protect
- Widescreen signaling
