= Improved-definition television =

Improved-definition television (IDTV) or enhanced-quality television transmitters and receivers exceed the performance requirements of the NTSC standard, while remaining within the general parameters of NTSC emissions standards.

IDTV improvements were introduced in the late 1980s, and may be made at the television transmitter or receiver. Improvements include enhancements in encoding, digital filtering, scan interpolation, interlaced line scanning, and ghost cancellation.

IDTV improvements must allow the TV signal to be transmitted and received in the standard 4:3 aspect ratio.

The only relevant implementation of IDTV for NTSC-based broadcasts before the introduction of full-digital TV distribution (DTV) was the Japanese Clear-Vision. In European countries, PALplus and MAC had a similar role. The more commonly used term for advanced display technology before the advent of high-definition television (HDTV) was enhanced-definition television (EDTV), used for instance for plasma TV sets with a 16:9 aspect ratio in the early 2000s.

== See also ==
- Enhanced-definition television (EDTV)
- Clear-Vision
- PALplus
- Comb filter
- Federal Standard 1037C
- Video scaler
