= IDTV =

IDTV may refer to:

- Improved-definition television, transmitters and receivers that exceed performance requirements of the NTSC standard
- Integrated digital television, television set with a built-in digital tuner
- Interactive television, adding data services to traditional television technology
- Investigation Discovery, a TV channel owned by Discovery Communications
- IDTV (company), a Dutch television production company
