= Pan and scan =

Method for adapting widescreen film to television

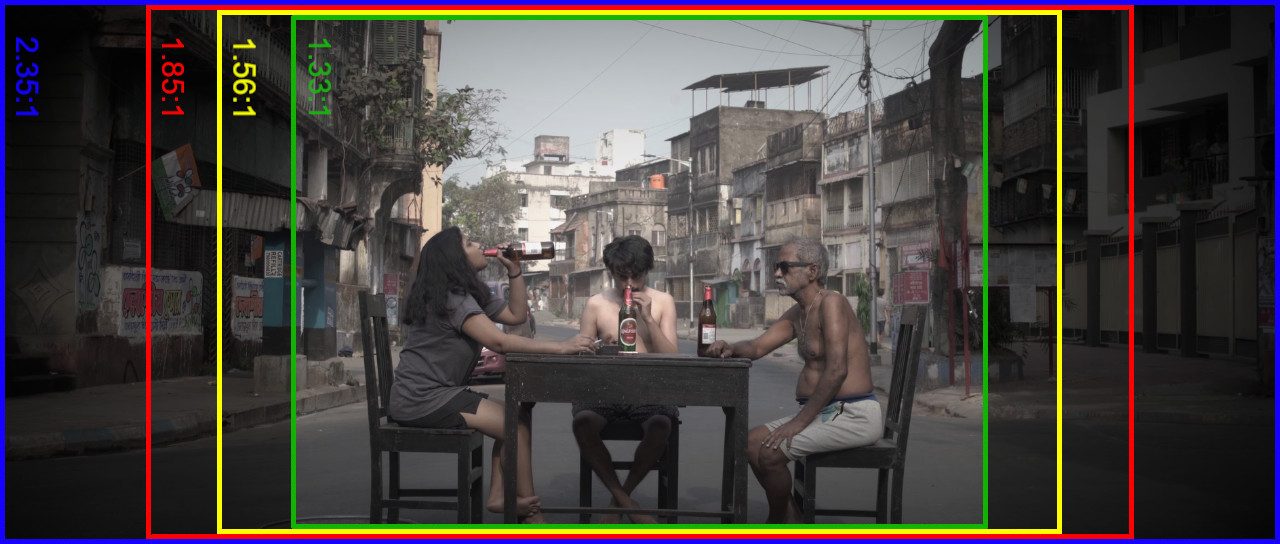
A 2.35:1 film still that was panned and scanned to smaller sizes. At the smallest size, 1.33:1 (4:3), nearly half of the original image has been cropped.

Pan and scan is a film editing technique used to modify widescreen images for display on a fullscreen screen. It involves cropping the sides of the original widescreen image and panning across it when the shot's focus changes. This cropping can result in the loss of key visual elements but may draw the viewers' attention towards a particular portion of the scene.

"Pan and scan" was often used with VHS tapes before widescreen home media formats such as LaserDisc, DVD, and Blu-ray became common. The vertical equivalent, known as "tilt and scan" or "reverse pan and scan," was used to adapt older films such as Cinderella (1950) for widescreen formats.

These techniques have been widely criticized since their inception, with critics often disapproving because it can remove substantial portions of the original image: up to 43% for films with a 2.35:1 aspect ratio, up to 48% for earlier 2.55:1 films, and up to 52% for 2.76:1 films. Creating new shots or cuts may alter cinematic effects, thereby impacting the pacing, atmosphere, and suspense originally intended by filmmakers. Pan and scan can sometimes alter the director's or cinematographer's original vision, as well as the intended field of view for specific scenes or an entire film, by depriving the audience of significant visual information.

== History ==
For the first several decades of television broadcasting, sets displayed images with a 4:3 (1.33:1) aspect ratio, which was standard for most theatrical films before 1960. In the early to mid-1950s, filmmakers began using widescreen formats such as CinemaScope and Todd-AO to compete with television and attract audiences to theaters by providing wider visual perspectives and compositional possibilities.

To accommodate the wider aspect ratio of films, television broadcasters adopted the pan and scan technique, which maintained image quality and size but sacrificed the ability to view the entire image. A film subjected to pan and scan often loses around half its horizontal size due to cropping. Letterboxing was an alternative method of displaying widescreen films on a 4:3 screen, maintaining the original aspect ratio by adding black space above and below the image but reducing the image's size and quality.

In 1986, the Voyager Company made it company policy to release widescreen films on LaserDisc only in their original aspect ratio rather than in pan and scan formats, which were common for home media releases. Many other home video labels followed suit.

In the 1990s, widescreen televisions offered a wider 16:9 aspect ratio (1.78 times the height), allowing films with aspect ratios of 1.66:1 and 1.85:1 to fill most or all of the screen with minimal letterboxing or cropping. DVD packaging began to use the expression, "16:9 – Enhanced for Widescreen TVs."

Films shot with aspect ratios of 2.20:1, 2.35:1, 2.39:1, 2.55:1, and especially 2.76:1 (Ben-Hur, for example), might still be problematic when displayed on televisions of any type. However, when the DVD is "anamorphically enhanced for widescreen", or the film is telecast on a high-definition channel and viewed on a widescreen TV, the black spaces are smaller, and the effect is much like watching a film on a theatrical widescreen.

As of 2018, though aspect ratios of 16:9 (and occasionally 16:10, mostly for computers and tablets) remain standard, wider-screen consumer TVs in 21:9 have been marketed by several manufacturers.

== Techniques ==
During the pan and scan process, an editor selects the parts of the original filmed composition that appear to be the focus of the shot and ensures that these are copied ("scanned"). When the important action shifts to a new position in the frame, the operator moves the scanner to follow it, creating the effect of Panning. In a scene where the focus does not gradually shift from one horizontal position to another, such as actors at each extreme engaging in rapid conversation, the editor may choose to "cut" from one to the other, rather than rapidly panning back and forth.

If the actors are closer together on the screen, the editor may pan slightly, alternately cropping one or the other partially. This method preserves the maximum resolution of the image since it uses all the available vertical video scan lines, which is especially important for NTSC televisions, having fewer lines than other standards. It also gives a full-screen image on a traditional television set; hence pan-and-scan versions of films on VHS or DVD are often known as Fullscreen.

However, this method also has several drawbacks. Some visual information is unavoidably cropped out. It can also change a shot in which the camera was originally stationary to one in which it is frequently panning or change a single continuous shot into one with frequent cuts. In a shot that was originally panned to show something new, or in which something enters the shot from off-camera, it changes the timing of these appearances for the audience.

For example, in the film Oliver!, made in Panavision, the criminal Bill Sikes commits a murder. The murder takes place mostly offscreen, behind a staircase wall, and Oliver is a witness. As Sikes steps back from behind the wall, the audience sees Oliver from the back watching him in terror. In the pan and scan version of the film, the audience sees Oliver's reaction as the murder is being committed, but not when Sikes steps backward from the wall having done it. Often in a pan and scan telecast, a character will seem to be speaking offscreen, because the pan and scan technique has cut their image out of the screen.

=== Shoot and protect ===
As television screenings of feature films became more common and financially important, cinematographers began to work on compositions that would keep the vital information within the TV-safe area of the frame. For example, the BBC suggested programme makers who were recording in 16:9 frame their shots in a 14:9 aspect ratio which was then broadcast on analogue services with small black bars at the top and bottom of the picture. Owners of widescreen TV sets receiving digital broadcasts would see the full 16:9 picture (this is known as Shoot and protect).

=== Reframing ===
One modern alternative to pan and scan is to adjust the source material directly. This is very rare; the only known uses are in computer-generated features, such as those produced by Pixar, and video games such as BioShock.

This approach to full screen versions is sometimes called reframing: some shots are pan and scan, while others (notably Warner Bros.' The Lego Movie) are transferred open matte (a full widescreen image extended with the added image above and below).

Another method is to keep the camera angle as tight as a pan shot, but move the location of characters, objects, or the camera so that the subjects fit in the frame. The advent of DVDs and their use of anamorphic presentation, coupled with the increasing popularity of widescreen televisions and computer monitors, has rendered pan and scan less important. Fullscreen versions of films originally produced in widescreen are still available in the United States.

=== Open matte ===
Filmmakers may also create an original image that includes visual information that extends above and below the widescreen theatrical image; this is known as an open matte image. This may still be considered pan-and-scanned, but it gives the compositor the freedom to "zoom out" or "un-crop" the image to include not only the full width of the wide-format image but also additional visual content at the top and/or bottom of the screen, not included in the widescreen version.

As a general rule (before the adoption of DVD), special effects would be done within the theatrical aspect ratio, but not the full frame thereof. The expanded image area can sometimes include extraneous objects—such as cables, microphone booms, jet vapor trails, or overhead telephone wires—not intended to be included in the frame, depending upon the nature of the shot and how well the full frame was protected.

A more unusual use of the technique is present in the 17 original Dragon Ball movies, released from 1986 to 1996. The films were displayed in 1.85:1 during their theatrical release, but this was cut down from 1.37:1 animation, a choice made so that the VHS releases would be nearly uncropped.

=== Adjusting cinematography to account for aspect ratios ===
Changes in screen angle (panning) may be necessary to prevent closeups between two speakers where only one person is visible in the pan and scan version and both participants seem to speak alternately to persons off-camera; this comes at the cost of losing the smoothness of scenes. Conversely, the cropping of a film originally shown in the standard ratio to fit widescreen televisions may cut off foreground or background, such as a tap-dance scene in which much attention is directed appropriately at a dancer's feet. This situation commonly occurs when a widescreen TV is set to display full images without stretching (often called the zoom setting) for content with an aspect ratio of 1.78:1 or less. The solution is to pillar box the image by adding black bars on either side of the image, which maintains the full picture height. In Europe, where the PAL TV format offers more resolution, pan and scan broadcasts and movie DVDs originally shown in widescreen are relatively rare, unless it is programming broadcasts aimed at family viewing times like A Bug's Life. However, on some channels in some countries (such as the United Kingdom), films with an aspect ratio of more than 1.85:1 are panned and scanned slightly to fit the broadcast 1.78:1 ratio.

== Criticism ==
Some film directors object to the use of pan and scan, arguing that it compromises their vision. Sydney Pollack decided to shoot his 1985 film Out of Africa in a matted 1.85:1 aspect ratio out of frustration with having his films shot in anamorphic 2.39:1 "butchered" for television and home video. In 1991, Pollack sued a Danish public television channel for airing a pan and scan version of his 1975 film Three Days of the Condor. The court ruled that the pan and scan version was a "mutilation" of the film and a violation of Pollack's droit moral, but ruled in favour of the defendant.

Woody Allen refused to release a pan and scan version of Manhattan (1979), and although Steven Spielberg eventually conceded to a pan and scan home video release of Raiders of the Lost Ark (1981), he successfully avoided them for The Color Purple (1985) and Always (1989). Similarly, Phil Lord and Christopher Miller made two versions of The Lego Movie (2014), one in anamorphic 2.39:1 and another in 1.37:1 open matte spherical format for cinemas not using anamorphic lenses, and to avoid a panned and scanned version of the 2.39:1 version being used for TV broadcasts. (Note: Extreme Movie (2008) was only released in 1.85:1, and Cloudy with a Chance of Meatballs (2009) was released on DVD in the original 2.39:1 and a cropped 16:9 version.)

Several prominent film critics, most notably Gene Siskel and Roger Ebert, have also criticized pan and scan and agreed with directors that movies should be presented as intended.

Amateur online critics have derided it with terms like "pan and scam" and "fool screen."

== See also ==
- Angle of view
- List of film formats
- Motion picture terminology
