= Windowbox (filmmaking) =

Combination of letterboxing and pillarboxing

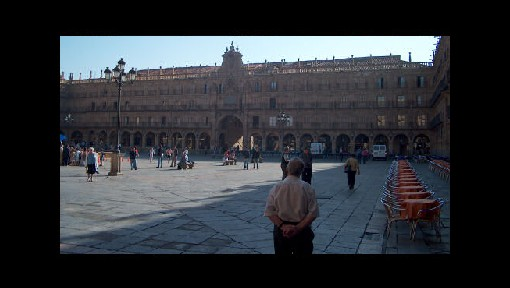
A windowboxed image (16:9 to 4:3 to 16:9)

Windowboxing (also called pictureboxing or the postage stamp effect) in the display of film or video occurs when the aspect ratio of the media is such that the letterbox effect and pillarbox effect occur simultaneously. Sometimes, by accident or design, a standard ratio image is presented in the central portion of a letterbox picture (or vice versa), resulting in a black border all around. It is generally disliked because it wastes much screen space and reduces the resolution of the original image. It can occur when a 16:9 film is set to 4:3 (letterbox), but then shown on a 16:9 TV or other output device. It can also occur in the opposite direction (4:3 to 16:9 to 4:3). Few films have been released with this aspect ratio — one example is The Crocodile Hunter: Collision Course, which had numerous scenes with Steve & Terri Irwin using widescreen pillar boxing.

== Deliberate windowboxing ==
A 4:3 ad pillarboxed for a 16:9 program, letterboxed by the broadcaster to fit the 4:3 channel, which is then viewed on a 16:9 TV that further pillarboxes the image

On rare occasion, a picture will be windowboxed on purpose. During the opening, documentary-style sequence of Rent on the DVD and Blu-ray Disc releases, the picture is windowboxed to suggest an older camera meant to present at a 4:3 aspect ratio; as the movie transitions from that segment, it then expands horizontally from a windowboxed 4:3 to a letterboxed 2.39:1 aspect ratio. Another example is in the movie Brother Bear. On the theatrical and Widescreen DVD release, the beginning of the film is windowboxed until Kenai, the main character, becomes a bear. This is to show that his world-view, and his perspective on nature, has widened. The intro to How I Met Your Mother was windowboxed in its 16:9 version.

A form of windowboxing is also occasionally encountered in 3D film; by containing the reference plane in a box smaller than the actual screen, the filmmaker can increase the stereoscopic effect of objects coming out of the plane and toward the viewer by having them extend outside the windowbox.

Windowboxing has also been used in the instance of transferring films with the academy ratio of 1.37:1 to video, as evidenced in recent DVD releases of older films shot in this standard. This is to compensate for the overscan on many 4:3 TVs, which cuts off part of all four sides of the image. Windowboxing ensures that either more or all of the image is visible on these TVs; in a best case scenario the TV overscan cuts off nothing but the windowbox borders. It originally was used only for the credit sequences in 4:3 films, where the text could extend out to the very edges of the image, but it was gradually adopted to be used throughout the film.

Critics often argue that windowboxing of this ratio is unnecessary due to the image loss caused by overscan being negligible. Moreover, for those who watch such films on computer monitors or newer TVs, both of which have little to no overscan, the black borders around all four sides of the image are visible, effectively shrinking the image on those displays. Windowboxing on video also reduces the total amount of resolution the image effectively uses, but defenders of the process argue that the lost resolution is negligible.

Defenders also argue that the prevalence of credit sequences being windowboxed on recent DVDs suggests a natural progression towards the full presentation being windowboxed, just as widescreen presentations progressed. However, letterboxing never ensured that the TV displaying it was showing the full image, just that it was present in the signal, while anamorphic enhancement on DVDs was designed to maximize the resolution used by widescreen films on the format, again with no compensation for overscan.

Defenders further argue that the traditional method of cropping 1.37:1 aspect ratio films to fill the 4:3 (1.33:1) ratio of standard definition video causes visual information, however negligible, to be permanently lost from the film. However, critics point out that this situation can be remedied by letterboxing the 1.37:1 image instead of windowboxing, while windowboxed images are often still in a 4:3 aspect ratio, meaning the lost image information was not restored by the process. Furthermore, DVD video has slightly more horizontal resolution than analogue video, giving it an effective aspect ratio of 1.38:1 which allows for a nearly full-screen 1.37:1 image to be stored without cropping, although whether this extra image information can be properly displayed depends on the equipment used.

Ultimately, the use of 4:3 windowboxing on video is dependent on whether or not the issue of overscan is better solved via hardware (through the use of newer equipment, to the detriment of those with older displays) or via software (through the use of windowboxing, to the detriment of those with newer displays).

At the time before widescreen televisions became popular, most video game consoles until the seventh generation were windowboxed when shown on a widescreen display. The windowboxing was done so that overscanning would be prevented when playing a game on a 4:3 television unit, and so that no on-screen information would be cut off. Some widescreen televisions have a horizontal stretch feature that stretches the image with minimal vertical cropping, compared to the vertical amount that normal zoom feature would crop off, but it causes far more distortion rather than normally zooming in on all four sides of the image.
