= Aspect ratio (image) =

Height/width of an image

The aspect ratio of an image is the ratio of its width to its height. It is expressed as two numbers separated by a colon, in the format width:height. Common aspect ratios are 1.85:1 and 2.39:1 in cinematography, 4:3 (originally) and 16:9 in television, and 3:2 in still photography. Other common display aspect ratios include 5:4 and 16:10. The 1:1 aspect ratio is used for square images, often seen on social media platforms like Instagram, and 21:9 is an "ultrawide" aspect ratio popular for gaming and desktop monitors.

== Some common examples ==
Common aspect ratios used in film and display images

The common film aspect ratios used in theaters are 1.85:1 and 2.39:1. Two common videographic aspect ratios are 4:3 (1.3̅:1), (Note: Repeating decimal notation) the universal video format of the 20th century, and 16:9 (1.7̅:1), universal for high-definition television and European digital television. Other cinematic and video aspect ratios exist, but are used infrequently.

In still camera photography, the most common aspect ratios are 4:3, 3:2 (1.5:1), and more recently found in consumer cameras, 16:9. Other aspect ratios, such as 5:3, 5:4, and 1:1 (square format), are used in photography as well, particularly in medium format and large format.

With television, DVD and Blu-ray, converting formats of unequal ratios is achieved by enlarging the original image to fill the receiving format's display area and cutting off any excess picture information (zooming and cropping), by adding horizontal mattes (letterboxing) or vertical mattes (pillarboxing) to retain the original format's aspect ratio, by stretching (hence distorting) the image to fill the receiving format's ratio, or by scaling by different factors in both directions, possibly scaling by a different factor in the center and at the edges (as in Wide Zoom mode).

== Practical limitations ==
In motion picture formats, the physical size of the film area between the sprocket perforations determines the image's size. The universal standard (established by William Dickson and Thomas Edison in 1892) is a frame that is four perforations high. The film itself is 35 mm wide (1.38 in), but the area between the perforations is 24.89 mm × 18.67 mm (0.980 in × 0.735 in), leaving the de facto ratio of 1.33:1.

With a space designated for the standard optical soundtrack, and the frame size reduced to maintain an image that is wider than tall; this resulted in the Academy aperture of 22 mm × 16 mm (0.866 in × 0.630 in) or 1.375:1 aspect ratio.

== Cinema terminology ==
The motion picture industry convention assigns a value of 1 to the image's height; an anamorphic frame (since 1970, approximately 2.39:1) is often incorrectly described (rounded) as 2.40:1. After 1952, a number of aspect ratios were experimented with for anamorphic productions, including 2.66:1 and 2.55:1. A SMPTE specification for anamorphic projection from 1957 (PH22.106-1957) finally standardized the aperture to 2.35:1. An update in 1970 (PH22.106-1971) changed the aspect ratio to 2.39:1 in order to make splices less noticeable. This aspect ratio of 2.39:1 was confirmed by the most recent revision from August 1993 (SMPTE 195–1993).

In American theaters, the common projection ratios are 1.85:1 and 2.39:1. Some European countries have the repeating decimal 1.6̅:1 as the widescreen standard. The "Academy ratio" of 1.375:1 was used for all cinema films in the sound era until 1953 (with the release of George Stevens's Shane in 1.6̅:1). During that time, television, which had a similar aspect ratio of 1.3̅:1, became a perceived threat to movie studios. Hollywood responded by creating a large number of widescreen formats: CinemaScope (up to 2.6̅:1), Todd-AO (2.20:1), and VistaVision (up to 2.00:1) to name just a few. The flat 1.85:1 aspect ratio debuted in May 1953, and became one of the most common cinema projection standards in the United States and elsewhere.

The goal of these various lenses and aspect ratios was to capture as much of the frame as possible, onto as large an area of the film as possible, in order to fully utilize the film being used. Some of the aspect ratios were chosen to utilize smaller film sizes in order to save film costs while other aspect ratios were chosen to use larger film sizes in order to produce a wider higher resolution image. In either case the image was squeezed horizontally to fit the film's frame size and avoid any unused film area.

=== Movie camera systems ===
The development of various film camera systems must ultimately cater to the placement of the frame in relation to the lateral constraints of the perforations and the optical soundtrack area. One clever wide screen alternative, VistaVision, used standard 35 mm film running sideways through the camera gate, so that the sprocket holes were above and below frame, allowing a larger horizontal negative size per frame as only the vertical size was now restricted by the perforations. There were even a limited number of projectors constructed to also run the print-film horizontally. Generally, however, the 1.50:1 ratio of the initial VistaVision image was optically converted to a vertical print (on standard four-perforation 35 mm movie film) to show with the standard projectors available at theaters, and was then masked in the projector to the United States standard of 1.85:1. The format was briefly revived by Lucasfilm in the late 1970s for visual effects work that required a larger negative size (due to image degradation from the optical printing steps necessary to make multi-layer composites). It went into obsolescence largely due to better cameras, lenses, and film stocks available for standard four-perforation formats, in addition to increased lab costs for making prints in comparison to more standard vertical processes. (The horizontal process was also adapted to 70 mm film by IMAX, which was first shown at the Osaka '70 Worlds Fair.)

Super 16 mm film was frequently used for television production due to its lower cost, lack of need for soundtrack space on the film itself (as it is not projected but rather transferred to video), and aspect ratio similar to 16:9 (the native ratio of Super 16 mm is 15:9). It also can be blown up to 35 mm for theatrical release and therefore is sometimes used for feature films.

== Current video standards ==
=== 1:1 ===
Square displays are rarely used in devices and monitors. Nonetheless, video consumption on social apps has grown rapidly and led to the emergence of new video formats more suited to mobile devices that can be held in horizontal and vertical orientations. In that sense, square video was popularized by mobile apps such as Instagram and Vine and has since been supported by other major social platforms including Facebook and X. It can fill nearly twice as much screen space compared to 16:9 format (when the device is held differently while viewing from how video was recorded).

=== 4:3 1.33:1 ===
4x3 (1.3̅3:1) (generally read as Four-Three, Four-by-Three, or Four-to-Three) for standard television for fullscreen aspect ratio 1.3̅3:1 has been in use since the invention of moving picture cameras, and many computer monitors used to employ the same aspect ratio. 4:3 was the aspect ratio used for 35 mm films in the silent era. It is also very close to the 1.375:1 Academy ratio, defined by the Academy of Motion Picture Arts and Sciences as a standard after the advent of optical sound-on-film. By having TV match this aspect ratio, movies originally photographed on 35 mm film could be satisfactorily viewed on TV in the early days of the medium (i.e. the 1940s and the 1950s).

With the adoption of high-definition television, the majority of modern televisions are now produced with 16:9 displays instead. Many of Apple's iPad series of tablets continue to use 4:3 displays (despite other Apple products typically using widescreen aspect ratios) to better suit use as an e-reader; however, the 2018 iPad Pro 11-inch, and future mid-sized iPads without home buttons, use a 1.43:1 aspect ratio, designed to fit into a similar area as the prior designs which had home buttons.

=== 14:9 ===
14:9 (generally named as Fourteen-by-Nine, Fourteen-Nine, and Fourteen-to-Nine) is the aspect ratio mainly used when the 4:3 programs are cropped.

=== 16:10 ===
16:10 (8:5) is an aspect ratio mostly used for computer displays and tablet computers. The width of the display is 1.6 times its height. This ratio is close to the golden ratio "$\varphi$" which is approximately 1.618. LCD computer displays using the 16:10 ratio started to appear in the mass market from 2003. By 2008, 16:10 had become the most common aspect ratio for LCD monitors and laptop displays. Since 2010, however, 16:9 has become the mainstream standard, driven by the 1080p standard for high definition television and lower manufacturing costs.

In 2005–2008, 16:10 (1.6:1) overtook 4:3 as the most sold aspect ratio for LCD monitors. At the time, 16:10 also had 90% of the notebook market and was the most commonly used aspect ratio for laptops. However, 16:10 had a short reign as the most common aspect ratio. Around 2009–2010, there was a rapid shift by computer display manufacturers to the 16:9 aspect ratio and by 2011 16:10 had almost disappeared from new mass market products. According to Net Applications, by October 2012 the market share of 16:10 displays had dropped to less than 23 percent.

Notably, Apple used 16:10 for all of its MacBook models until 2021, when the 5th-generation MacBook Pro switched to a taller aspect ratio of approximately 1.54:1. The MacBook Air switched to the same aspect ratio with its 5th generation in 2022. Both aspect ratios are designed to maintain the 16:10 ratio for standard content, with extra area at the top of the display to house the front camera notch and the macOS menu bar.

=== 16:9 ===
16:9 (1.78:1) (generally named as Sixteen-by-Nine, Sixteen-Nine, and Sixteen-to-Nine) is the international standard format of HDTV, non-HD digital television and analog widescreen television PALplus. Japan's Hi-Vision originally started with a 5:3 (= 15:9) ratio but converted when the international standards group introduced a wider ratio of 5 1/3 to 3 (= 16:9). Many digital video cameras have the capability to record in 16:9 (= 4^{2}:3^{2}), and 16:9 is the only widescreen aspect ratio natively supported by the DVD standard. DVD producers can also choose to show even wider ratios such as 1.66:1, 1.75:1, 1.77:1 and 1.78:1 within the 16:9 DVD frame by hard matting or adding black bars within the image itself. The 16:9 aspect ratio was used often in British TVs in the United Kingdom in the 1990s, and is also used in smartphones, laptops, and desktops.

=== 1.85:1 ===
Equivalent to integer ratio of 37:20. When theater attendance dropped, Hollywood created widescreen aspect ratios in order to differentiate the film industry from TV, with one of the most common being the 1.85:1 ratio.

=== 2.00:1 ===
The 2.00:1 aspect ratio was first used in the 1950s for the RKO Superscope format.

Since 1998, cinematographer Vittorio Storaro has advocated for a format named "Univisium" that uses a 2.00:1 format. Univisium has gained little traction in the theatrical film market, but has recently been used by Netflix and Amazon Video for productions such as House of Cards and Transparent, respectively. This aspect ratio is similar to the 1.90:1 standard acquisition formats mandated by these content platforms and is not necessarily a creative choice.

Moreover, some mobile devices, such as the LG G6, LG V30, Huawei Mate 10 Pro, Google Pixel 2 XL, OnePlus 5T and Sony Xperia XZ3, are embracing the 2.00:1 format (advertised as 18:9), as well as the Samsung Galaxy S8, Samsung Galaxy Note 8, Samsung Galaxy S9 and Samsung Galaxy Note 9 with a slightly similar 18.5:9 format. The Apple iPhone X also has a similar screen ratio of 19.5:9 (2.16:1).

=== 2.39:1 ===
Anamorphic format is the cinematography technique of shooting a widescreen picture on standard 35 mm film or other visual recording media with a non-widescreen native aspect ratio. When projected the image is then stretched back into the original proportions.

== Obtaining height, width, and area of the screen ==
Often, screen specifications are given by their diagonal length. The following formulae can be used to find the height (h), width (w) and area (A), where r stands for ratio, written as a fraction of x by y, and d for diagonal length.

$$r = \frac{x}{y}$$
$$h = \frac{d}{\sqrt{r^2+1}} = \frac{y \times d}{\sqrt{x^2+y^2}}$$
$$w = \frac{r\times d}{\sqrt{{r^2}+1}} = \frac{x \times d}{\sqrt{x^2+y^2}}$$
$$A = \frac{r\times d^2}{{r^2}+1} \quad= \frac{x \times y \times d^2}{x^2+y^2}$$

== Distinctions ==
This article primarily addresses the aspect ratio of images as displayed, which is more formally referred to as the display aspect ratio (DAR). In digital images, there is a distinction with the storage aspect ratio (SAR), which is the ratio of numbers of pixels. If an image is displayed with square pixels, then these ratios agree. If, instead, non-square ("rectangular") pixels are used, then these ratios differ. The aspect ratio of the pixels themselves is known as the pixel aspect ratio (PAR) – for square pixels this is 1:1 – and these are related by the identity:

SAR × PAR = DAR

Rearranging (solving for PAR) yields:

PAR = DAR/SAR

For example:

- A 640 × 480 VGA image has
  - a SAR of 640/480 = 4:3
  - and if displayed on a 4:3 display (DAR = 4:3), has square pixels, hence a PAR of 1:1.
- By contrast, a 720 × 576 D-1 PAL image has
  - a SAR of 720/576 = 5:4
  - but is displayed on a 4:3 display (DAR = 4:3), so by this formula it would have a PAR of (4:3)/(5:4) = 16:15.

However, because standard definition digital video was originally based on digitally sampling analog television, the 720 horizontal pixels actually capture a slightly wider image to avoid loss of the original analog picture. In actual images, these extra pixels are often partly or entirely black, as only the center 704 horizontal pixels carry actual 4:3 or 16:9 image. Hence, the actual pixel aspect ratio PAR for PAL video is a little different from that given by the formula, specifically 12:11 for PAL and 10:11 for NTSC. For consistency, the same effective pixel aspect ratios are used even for standard definition digital video originated in digital form rather than converted from analog. For more details refer to the main article.

In analog images such as film there is no notion of pixel, nor notion of SAR or PAR, and "aspect ratio" refers unambiguously to DAR. Actual displays do not generally have non-square pixels, though digital sensors might; they are rather a mathematical abstraction used in resampling images to convert between resolutions.

Non-square pixels often arise in early digital TV standards, related to digitalization of analog TV signals – whose horizontal and vertical resolutions differ and are thus best described by non-square pixels – and also in some digital videocameras and computer display modes, such as Color Graphics Adapter (CGA). Today they arise particularly in transcoding between resolutions with different SARs.

DAR is also known as image aspect ratio and picture aspect ratio, though the latter can be confused with pixel aspect ratio; PAR is also known as sample aspect ratio, though it can also be confused with storage aspect ratio.

== Previous and currently used aspect ratios ==
Comparison of several film aspect ratios with the heights forced to be equal images

9:16
A trend arising from the widespread use of smartphones is vertical video that is intended for viewing in portrait mode. The format was popularized in particular by apps such as Snapchat, Instagram, and YouTube—which all offer means for publishing vertical videos as content and advertising.
1:2.32
The first television aspect ratio, used by John Logie Baird's 30-line mechanical television in the early 1930s.
1.19:1
Sometimes referred to as the Movietone ratio, this ratio was used briefly during the transitional period when the film industry was converting to sound, from 1926 to 1932 approx. It is produced by superimposing an optical soundtrack over a full-gate 1.3̅ aperture in printing, resulting in an almost square image. Films shot in this ratio are often projected or transferred to video incorrectly using a 1.375:1 mask or squashed to 1.375:1. Examples of films shot in the Movietone ratio include Sunrise: A Song of Two Humans, M, Hallelujah!, and, significantly more recently, The Lighthouse.
1.25:1 = 5:4
The once-popular aspect for larger format computer monitors, especially in the guise of mass-produced 17-inch and 19-inch LCD panels or 19-inch and 21-inch CRTs, using 1280 × 1024 (SXGA) or similar resolutions. Notably one of the few popular display aspect ratios narrower than 4:3, and one popularised by business (CAD, DTP) rather than entertainment use, as it is well-suited to full-page layout editing. Historically, 5:4 was also the original aspect ratio of early 405-line television broadcasts, which progressed to a wider 4:3 as the idea of broadcasting cinema films gained traction.
1.3̅:1 = 4:3 = 12:9 = 16:12
35 mm original silent film ratio, today commonly known in TV and video as 1.33:1. Also standard ratio for MPEG-2 video compression. This format is still used in many personal video cameras today and has influenced the selection or design of other aspect ratios. It is the standard Super 35 mm ratio.
1.37:1 ~ 48:35
16 mm and 35 mm standard ratio.
1.375:1 = 11:8
35 mm full-screen sound film image, nearly universal in films between 1932 and 1953. Officially adopted as the Academy ratio in 1932 by AMPAS. Rarely used in theatrical context nowadays, but occasionally used in other contexts.
1.43:1
IMAX format. IMAX productions use 70 mm wide film (the same as used for 70 mm feature films), but the film runs through the camera and projector horizontally. This allows for a physically larger area for each image.
1.5:1 = 3:2
The aspect ratio of 35 mm film used for still photography when eight perforations are exposed. Also the native aspect ratio of VistaVision, for which the film runs horizontally. Used on the ChromeOS-based Chromebook Pixel notebook PC, the Game Boy Advance portable game console, mostly all Microsoft Surface 2-in-1 laptops and Surface Studio.
1.5̅:1 = 14:9
Widescreen aspect ratio sometimes used in shooting commercials etc. as a compromise format between 4:3 and 16:9. When converted to a 16:9 frame, there is slight pillarboxing, while conversion to 4:3 creates slight letterboxing. All widescreen content on ABC Family's SD feed until January 2016 was presented in this ratio.
1.6:1 = 16:10 = 8:5
Widescreen computer monitor ratio (for instance, 1920×1200 resolution).
1.66:1 or 1.6̅:1 = 5:3 = 15:9
Early 35 mm widescreen ratio, originally invented by Paramount Pictures, later a standard among several European countries. It is also the native Super 16 mm frame ratio. Sometimes this ratio is rounded to 1.67:1. From the late 1980s to the early 2000s, Walt Disney Feature Animation's CAPS program animated their features in the 1.6̅:1 ratio (a compromise between the 1.85:1 theatrical ratio and the 1.3̅:1 ratio used for home video); this format is also used by the Nintendo 3DS's top screen.
1.75:1 = 7:4
35 mm widescreen aspect ratio used by Metro-Goldwyn-Mayer and Warner Bros. from 1953 to 1955, since abandoned. The Walt Disney Company produced elements of some post-1950s theatrical films in a 1.33:1 ratio for television broadcast versions, and later matted or cropped to a 1.75:1 widescreen aspect ratio. One such film is The Jungle Book, presented in the 1.75:1 ratio for its 1978 rerelease, DVD, and Blu-Ray, and a 1.33:1 aspect ratio for VHS. Cinderella (1950 film) was rereleased in 1973 in the 1.75:1 aspect ratio, not its original 1.37:1 Academy ratio.
1.7̅:1 = 4:2.25 = 5.3̅:3 = 16:9
Video widescreen standard, used in high-definition television, one of three ratios specified for MPEG-2 video compression. Also used increasingly in personal video cameras. Sometimes this ratio is rounded to 1.78:1.
1.85:1 = 37:20
35 mm American and British widescreen standard for theatrical film. Introduced by Universal Pictures in May 1953. Projects approximately three perforations ("perfs") of image space per four-perf frame; films can be shot in 3-perf to save cost of film stock. Also the ratio of Ultra 16 mm. One of two common formats in digital cinema, where it is called "flat".
1.875:1 = 15:8
HDTV ratio used by Silicon Graphics computers in the 1990s, with the resolution being specified as 1920×1024.
1.9:1
SMPTE/DCI digital cinema basic resolution container aspect ratio. Exact ratio is 256:135 but it is commonly referred to as 1.9:1 or 1.90:1 and sometimes 1.896:1. Used by Diao Yinan's The Wild Goose Lake.
2:1 = 18:9
Recently popularized by the Red Digital Cinema. Original SuperScope ratio, also used in Univisium. Used as a flat ratio for some American studios in the 1950s and abandoned in the 1960s. Also used in recent mobile phones such as the LG G6, Google Pixel 2 XL, HTC U11+, Xiaomi MIX 2S, and Huawei Mate 10 Pro, while the Samsung Galaxy S8, Note 8, and S9 use the similar 18.5:9 ratio.
2.165:1 ~ 28:13
Used by the screens of some iPhone models since 2017, including the iPhone X, XS, XS Max, 11, 11 Pro, and 11 Pro Max.
2.208:1 ~ 11:5
70 mm standard. Originally developed for Todd-AO in the 1950s. Specified in MPEG-2 as 2.20:1, but hardly used.
2.35:1 ~ 47:20
35 mm anamorphic prior to 1970, used by CinemaScope ("'Scope") and early Panavision. The anamorphic standard has subtly changed so that contemporary anamorphic productions are actually 2.39:1, but often referred to as 2.35:1 anyway, due to old convention. (Anamorphic refers to the compression of the image on film to maximize an area slightly taller than standard 4-perf Academy aperture, but presents the widest of aspect ratios.) All Indian Bollywood films released after 1972 are shot in this standard for theatrical exhibition.
2.3̅:1 = 21:9 = 64:27
TVs were produced with this aspect ratio between 2009 and 2012 and marketed as "21:9 cinema displays". But this aspect ratio is still seen on some higher-end monitors, which are sometimes called UltraWide monitors.
2.39:1 ~ 43:18 = 21 1/2:9
35 mm anamorphic from 1970 onwards. Aspect ratio of current anamorphic widescreen theatrical viewings, commercials, and some music videos. Often commercially branded as Panavision format or "'Scope". One of two common formats in digital cinema, where it is called "scope".
2.4:1 = 12:5 ~ 21:9
Rounded notation of 2.39:1 also known as 2.40:1. All film releases may use 800 lines of the 1920×800 resolution resulting in the 2.40:1 aspect ratio of Blu-ray Disc.
2.55:1 = 51:20
The aspect ratio of CinemaScope from 1954 to 1956. This was also the aspect ratio of CinemaScope 55.
2.5̅9̅2̅:1 = 70:27
Cinerama at full height (three specially captured 35 mm images projected side by side into one composite widescreen image).
2.6̅:1 = 8:3 = 24:9
Full-frame output from Super 16 mm negative when an anamorphic lens system has been used. Effectively, an image that is of the ratio 24:9 is squashed onto the native 15:9 aspect ratio of a Super 16 mm negative. Also used by Kirill Serebrennikov for Leto (2018).
2.66:1
Original aspect ratio of CinemaScope before optical sound was added to the film in 1954.
2.76:1 = 69:25
Ultra Panavision 70/MGM Camera 65 (65 mm with 1.25× anamorphic squeeze). Used only on a handful of films between 1957 and 1966 and some in the 2010s, for some sequences of How the West Was Won (1962) with a slight crop when converted to three-strip Cinerama, and films such as It's a Mad, Mad, Mad, Mad World (1963) and Ben-Hur (1959). More recently, Quentin Tarantino used it for The Hateful Eight (2015); Gareth Edwards used the process for shooting Rogue One (2016), but the image was cropped to 2.39:1 in post; Edwards would later shoot The Creator (2023) in this ratio.
3.5̅:1 = 32:9
In 2017, Samsung and Philips announced "Super UltraWide displays", with aspect ratio of 32:9.
3.6:1 = 18:5
In 2016, IMAX announced the release of films in "Ultra-WideScreen 3.6" format, with an aspect ratio of 36:10. Ultra-WideScreen 3.6 video format didn't spread, as cinemas in an even wider ScreenX 270° format were released.
4:1
Rare use of Polyvision, three 35 mm 1.3̅:1 images projected side by side. First used in 1927 on Abel Gance's Napoléon.
12:1
Circle-Vision 360° developed by the Walt Disney Company in 1955 for use in Disneyland. Uses nine 4:3 35 mm projectors to show an image that surrounds the viewer. Used in subsequent Disney theme parks and other past applications.

== Aspect ratio releases ==
=== Original aspect ratio (OAR) ===
Original Aspect Ratio (OAR) is a home theater term for the aspect ratio or dimensions in which a film or visual production was produced, as envisioned by the people involved in the creation of the work. As an example, the film Gladiator was released to theaters in the 2.40:1 aspect ratio. It was filmed in Super 35 and, in addition to being presented in theaters and television in the Original Aspect Ratio (OAR) of 2.40:1, it was also broadcast without the matte, altering the aspect ratio to the television standard of 1.33:1. Because of the varied ways in which films are shot, IAR (Intended Aspect Ratio) is a more appropriate term, but is rarely used.

=== Modified aspect ratio (MAR) ===
Modified Aspect Ratio (MAR) is a home theater term for the aspect ratio or dimensions in which a film was modified to fit a specific type of screen, as opposed to original aspect ratio. Modified aspect ratios are usually either 1.33:1 (historically), or (with the advent of widescreen television sets) 1.43:1 aspect ratio. 1.33:1 was the modified aspect ratio used historically on 4:3 broadcast television and home videotape formats such as VHS and Beta. A modified aspect ratio transfer is achieved by means of pan and scan or EAR (Expanded Aspect Ratio)/open matte, the latter meaning removing the cinematic matte from a 2.40:1 film to open up the full 1.33:1 frame or from 2.40:1 to 1.43:1 in IMAX. Another name for it is rescaled aspect ratio.

== Problems in film and television ==
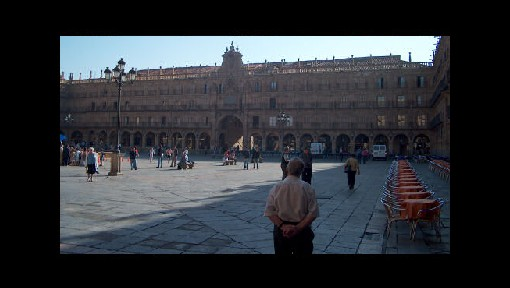
A windowboxed image

Multiple aspect ratios create additional burdens on directors and the public, and confusion among TV broadcasters. It is common for a widescreen film to be presented in an altered format (cropped, letterboxed or expanded beyond the original aspect ratio). It is also not uncommon for windowboxing to occur (when letterbox and pillarbox happen simultaneously). For instance, a 16:9 broadcast could embed a 4:3 commercial within the 16:9 image area. A viewer watching on a standard 4:3 (non-widescreen) television would see a 4:3 image of the commercial with 2 sets of black stripes, vertical and horizontal (windowboxing or the postage stamp effect). A similar scenario may also occur for a widescreen set owner when viewing 16:9 material embedded in a 4:3 frame, and then watching that in 16:9. Active Format Description is a mechanism used in digital broadcasting to avoid this problem. It is also common that a 4:3 image is stretched horizontally to fit a 16:9 screen to avoid pillarboxing but distorts the image so subjects appear short and fat.

Both NTSC and PAL have provisions for some data pulses contained within the video signal used to signal the aspect ratio (See ITU-R BT.1119-1 – Widescreen signaling for broadcasting). These pulses are detected by television sets that have widescreen displays and cause the television to automatically switch to 16:9 display mode. When 4:3 material is included (such as the aforementioned commercial), the television switches to a 4:3 display mode to correctly display the material. Where a video signal is transmitted via a European SCART connection, one of the status lines is used to signal 16:9 material as well.

== Still photography ==
Common aspect ratios in still photography include:

- 1:1 (1.0̅:1)
- 5:4 (1.25:1)
- 4:3 (1.3̅:1)
- 3:2 (1.5:1)
- 5:3 (1.6̅:1)
- 16:9 (1.77:1 or 1.78:1)
- 3:1 (3.0̅:1)

Many digital still cameras offer user options for selecting multiple image aspect ratios. Some achieve this through the use of multi-aspect sensors (notably Panasonic), while others simply crop their native image format to have the output match the desired image aspect ratio.

=== 1:1 ===
1:1 is the classic Kodak image, and is available as a choice in some digital still cameras, and hearkens back to the days of film cameras when the square image was popular with photographers using twin lens reflex cameras. These medium format cameras used 120 film rolled onto spools. The 6 × 6 cm image size was the classic 1:1 format in the recent past. 120 film can still be found and used today. Many Polaroid instant films were designed as square formats. Furthermore, up until August 2015, photo-sharing site Instagram only allowed users to upload images in 1:1 format. In 2017, Fujifilm added the 1:1 Instax Square format to their lineup of instant film cameras with the SQ10, followed by the fully analogue SQ6 in 2018.

=== 5:4 ===
Common in large and medium format photography (with "6 × 7" cameras that have an actual size of 56 mm × 70 mm [2.2 in × 2.8 in]), which fits the common print paper size of 8 in × 10 in (20.3 cm × 25.4 cm) without cropping and is still in common use for prints from digital cameras.

=== 4:3 ===
4:3 is used by most digital point-and-shoot cameras, Four Thirds system, Micro Four Thirds system cameras and medium format 645 cameras. The 4:3 digital format popularity was developed to match the then prevailing digital displays of the time, 4:3 computer monitors. The next several formats have their roots in classic film photography image sizes, both the classic 35 mm film camera, and the multiple format Advanced Photo System (APS) film camera. The APS camera was capable of selecting any of three image formats, APS-H ("High Definition" mode), APS-C ("Classic" mode) and APS-P ("Panoramic" mode).

=== 3:2 ===
3:2 is used by classic 35 mm film cameras using a 36 mm × 24 mm image size, and their digital derivatives represented by DSLRs. Typical DSLRs come in two flavors, the so-called professional "full frame" (36 mm × 24 mm) sensors and variations of smaller, so-called "APS-C" sensors. The term "APS" is derived from another film format known as APS and the "-C" refers to "Classic" mode, which exposed images over a smaller area (25.1 mm × 16.7 mm) but retaining the same "classic" 3:2 proportions as full frame 35 mm film cameras.

When discussing DSLRs and their non-SLR derivatives, the term APS-C has become an almost generic term. The major camera manufacturers, including Canon, Sony, and Nikon, each developed and established sensor standards for their own versions of APS-C-sized and proportioned sensors. Canon actually developed two standards, APS-C and a slightly larger area APS-H (not to be confused with the APS-H film format), while Nikon developed its own APS-C standard, which it calls DX. Regardless of the different flavors of sensors, and their varying sizes, they are close enough to the original APS-C image size, and maintain the classic 3:2 image proportions that these sensors are generally known as an "APS-C" sized sensor.

The reason for DSLR's image sensors being the flatter 3:2 versus the taller point-and-shoot 4:3 is that DSLRs were designed to match the legacy 35 mm SLR film, whereas the majority of digital cameras were designed to match the predominant computer displays of the time, with VGA, SVGA, XGA and UXGA all being 4:3. Widescreen computer monitors did not become popular until the advent of HDTV, which uses a 16:9 image aspect ratio.

=== 16:9 ===
Known as APS-H (30.2 mm × 16.7 mm), with the "-H" denoting "High Definition", the 16:9 format is also the standard image aspect ratio for HDTV. 16:9 is gaining popularity as a format in all classes of consumer still cameras which also shoot High Definition (HD) video. When still cameras have an HD video capability, some can also record stills in the 16:9 format, ideal for display on HD televisions and widescreen computer displays.

=== 3:1 ===
3:1 is yet another format that can find its roots in the APS film camera. Known as APS-P (30.2 × 9.5 mm), with the -P" denoting "Panorama", the 3:1 format was used for panorama photography. The APS-P panorama standard is the least adhered to any APS standard, and panoramic implementation varies with by manufacturer on different cameras, with the only commonality being that the image is much longer than it is tall, in the classic "panorama" style.

Common print sizes in the United States (in inches) include 4×6 (1.5), 5×7 (1.4), 4×5 and 8×10 (1.25), and 11×14 (1.27); large format cameras typically use one of these aspect ratios. Medium-format cameras typically have format designated by nominal sizes in centimeters (6×6, 6×7, 6×9, 6×4.5), but these numbers should not be interpreted as exact in computing aspect ratios. For example, the usable height of 120-format roll film is 56mm, so a width of 70mm (as in 6×7) yields an aspect ratio of 4:5 – ideal for enlarging to make an 8×10" portrait. Print sizes are usually defined by their portrait dimensions (tall) while equipment aspect ratios are defined by their landscape dimensions (wide, flipped sideways). A good example of this a 4×6 print (6 inch wide by 4 inch tall landscape) perfectly matches the 3:2 aspect ratio of a DSLR/35 mm, since 6/2=3 and 4/2=2.

For analog projection of photographic slides, projector and screen use a 1:1 aspect ratio, supporting horizontal and vertical orientation equally well. In contrast, digital projection technology typically supports vertically oriented images only at a fraction of the resolution of landscape-oriented images. For example, projecting a digital still image having a 3:2 aspect ratio on a 16:9 projector employs 84.3% of available resolution in horizontal orientation, but only 37.5% in vertical orientation.

== See also ==
- Active Format Description
- IMAX (Image Maximum)
- Index of articles related to motion pictures
- Paper size
- Shoot and protect
- Glossary of video terms
- Ultrawide formats

== Sources ==
=== On aspect ratios ===
- "NEC Monitor Technology Guide". Archived from the original on 2006-05-21.
- The Letterbox and Widescreen Advocacy Page
- American Widescreen Museum
- Widescreen Apertures and Aspect Ratios
- Aspect Ratios Explained: Part 1 Part 2
- Explanation of TV Aspect Ratio format description codes
- SCADplus: 16:9 Action plan for the television in the 16:9 screen format – European Union
