= PALplus =

Analogue widescreen television broadcasting system

A 1996 RTL-TVI test card showing the use of PALplus.

PALplus (or PAL+) is an analogue television broadcasting system aimed to improve and enhance the PAL format by allowing 16:9 (or 1.77:1) aspect ratio broadcasts, while remaining compatible with existing television receivers, defined by International Telecommunication Union (ITU) recommendation BT.1197-1. Introduced in 1993, it followed experiences with the HD-MAC (high definition) and D2-MAC, hybrid analogue-digital widescreen formats that were incompatible with PAL receivers. It was developed at the University of Dortmund in Germany, in cooperation with German terrestrial broadcasters and European and Japanese manufacturers. The system had some adoption across Europe during the late 1990s and helped introduce widescreen TVs in the market, but never became mainstream.

A similar system, developed in Japan at the same time and named EDTV-II/ Wide-aspect Clear-vision, allows for 16:9 NTSC broadcasts.

== History ==
The MAC family of standards was adopted in Europe in 1983, primarily for Direct Broadcasting by Satellite (DBS) services. This was an evolution from older color TV systems (such as PAL or SECAM) fixing the problems of interference between luminance and chrominance, and providing a stepping stone for a future HDTV system. In 1986, a new high definition broadcasting standard, HD-MAC, was presented, offering twice the number of scanning lines compared to PAL. A transitional standard, D2-MAC was established. It had the same number of lines as PAL, but like HD-MAC it was designed for 16:9 widescreen content.

In 1989, the PALplus strategy group was founded. The goal was to develop an enhanced system for terrestrial transmission compatible with PAL. European terrestrial broadcasters felt the need to better position themselves in order to compete with satellite and cable operators, in view of the introduction of MAC widescreen broadcasts. While not attempting to produce HDTV standards of quality, the new format was meant to improve PAL in the following areas:

- Wider aspect ratio, but with acceptable effects on the traditional 4:3 (or 1.33:1) screen
- Reduced level of artefacts, such as cross-color
- Better sound system
- Improved resolution
- Compatibility with existing receivers.

In the beginning, the task group consisted of the public broadcasting corporations of Germany (ARD and ZDF), Austria (ORF), Switzerland (SRG) and the United Kingdom (BBC and UKIB, United Kingdom Independent Broadcasters) together with the consumer electronics manufacturers Grundig, Nokia, Philips and Thomson. Sony as well as the Spanish (RTVE) and Portuguese (RTP) broadcasters joined the group later on.

At the Berlin IFA 1991, a first PALplus test transmission was demonstrated

At the Berlin IFA 1993, the first experimental PALplus broadcasts began. In the same year, the European Union approved a plan to support the production and broadcast of 16:9 programs.

In 1994, broadcasters began adopting the format. In the United Kingdom, Channel 4 starts to broadcast using the system in October. Nokia launched the first PALplus TV set in Germany.

In 1995, the International Telecommunication Union publishes recommendation BT.1197-1, defining the PALplus system. Originally, the PALplus consortium included the following manufacturers: Philips, Grundig, Thomson, Nokia and Sony. One of the four big Korean electronics manufacturers, Samsung, joined the PALplus consortium that year. VCR manufacturers associated with the PALplus consortium were expected to launch updated VHS and S-VHS home recorders soon. The cost increment compared to conventional PAL VCRs was expected to be small. PALplus was one of the highlights of the Berlin IFA 1995 edition.

In January 1996, the PALplus board published the specifications of the standard in order to support the further dissemination of this standard for wide-screen transmissions. After German broadcasters started to broadcast some of their programmes using the format, the board ended its work by the end of that same year.

At the beginning of 1998, PALplus programmes were broadcast on a regular basis in nine European countries, which made PALplus the mostly used standard for widescreen transmissions in Europe at that time. Evaluations, performed by ITU and EBU engineers in 1995-1998 concluded that the use of down-converted HDTV source material, as well as high-quality widescreen standard definition content, could be a significant benefit to the PALplus picture quality. Moreover, the experts felt that PALplus would not be out of place in an HDTV environment at viewing distances equal or farther to four heights of a television set. It was presumed that the standard method of display of a PALplus signal would be in 625-line interlaced (50 Hz) form, although other display formats (for example, 50 Hz progressive, 100 Hz interlace, or 100 Hz progressive) could be receiver options.

== Countries and territories that used PALplus ==
The following countries and territories used the PALplus system:

- Austria
- Belgium
- Finland
- Germany
- Greece
- Ireland
- Italy
- Netherlands
- Poland
- Portugal
- Spain
- UK

=== Belgium ===
In Belgium, the Flemish public broadcasting service VRT had a policy that all of its self-created TV programmes are broadcast in PALplus. The commercial TV station VTM used to broadcast a lot in PALplus. Even the third broadcasting organisation SBS Belgium with its stations VT4 and VijfTV used to broadcast in PALplus for all of their new productions.

The Walloon public broadcasting service RTBF used to broadcast 16:9 programmes that it purchased in PALplus, but preferred creating their own programmes in 4:3. Walloon commercial TV station RTL-TVI used to broadcast almost all its shows in PALplus.

In 2010, Belgium switched off analog television broadcast.

=== Finland ===
In Finland, the commercial broadcaster MTV3 started broadcasting the youth music program Jyrki in PALplus format on August 18, 1997. The experiment ended when the program ended some four years later.

In 2007, Finland switched off analog television broadcast.

=== Germany ===
In Germany, all public broadcasters (ARD, ZDF, etc.) complied with this standard. However, private broadcasters (RTL, ProSieben, etc) have shown no interest in either this standard or in the 16:9 format.

Pay-per-view channels such as those on Sky often broadcast in 16:9, but use a different standard that requires another kind of decoder.

In 2008, Germany began switching off analog television broadcast.

=== Greece ===
In Greece, there were sporadic PALplus broadcasts by the national television (ERT - Hellenic Radio Television) on the ERT3 channel. Throughout the '90s several attempts from commercial broadcasters in adopting the system failed due to lack of popularity.

As some of the repeaters of ERT's channels were fed via OTE (Greek public telecom provider) in uncompressed form over terrestrial links, and others via NOVA (Greece's only satellite platform) using MPEG encoding, Palplus wasn't available on all areas. The heavy MPEG encoding on NOVA degraded WSS signaling and the additional information embedded in PALplus, making it undecodable.

=== Italy ===
It was used by broadcasters such as RAI (Italy).

=== Ireland ===
RTÉ Ireland’s public service broadcaster, began to broadcast widescreen programming in 1995, initially on Network 2 Television in a special slot, mostly focused on documentaries, music and feature films, but over time more widescreen programming was introduced.

=== Netherlands ===
In the Netherlands, the public broadcasters used PALplus up to 2005. With the switch to digital television and anamorphic widescreen, the system was discontinued with the end of terrestrial analogue broadcasts in November 2006. Analog broadcasts continued on cable operations, but PALplus wasn't used for down conversion on those services.

=== Poland ===
In Poland, the only documented use of PALplus is by TV Polonia on 31 December 1996.

=== Portugal ===
In Portugal, the private broadcaster TVI began broadcasting movies in PALplus in 1994, but some years after it left the standard behind.

The public broadcaster RTP started using the format on 5 December 1997.

The system was used to broadcast selected programs (about five programs each day) and some widescreen movies on analog terrestrial broadcasts. Cable distributors occasionally strip the signal of the WSS bits, rendering the system inoperative. Also, when Digital Terrestrial Television broadcasts started, there was no dedicated anamorphic simulcast for the digital channels. Therefore, PALplus over terrestrial analog PAL broadcasts remained the only source of 576 lines widescreen TV in Portugal for many years.

Since the middle of 2010 PALplus was dropped in favor of regular 16:9 letterbox, because the system caused considerable image degradation when used on digital transmissions without any decoding.

With the end of analog broadcasts by 2012, the system became officially obsolete.

=== Spain ===
In Spain, the system was used by the public broadcaster RTVE. The Catalan public television, TV3, trialed the PALplus format in 1994, with a weekly broadcast of a film in this format. Other public regional stations (like Galicia's CRTVG) tested the format too, but after these trials the technology was dropped and 16:9 digital broadcasts were not introduced until 2007.

=== United Kingdom ===
In the United Kingdom, Channel 4 adopted the system to broadcast selected films after October 1994. Some programmes, including Fifteen to One and the omnibus edition of Brookside were also broadcast this way. BBC didn't adopt the system, opting instead for digital widescreen broadcasts. All of the six main broadcasters, BBC, ITV, Channel 4, Five, Sky and Virgin Media, now broadcast in digital.

Analog television broadcast was switched off in the United Kingdom in 2012.

== Operation ==
A standard PAL receiver will display the 16:9 image in letterbox format with 432 active lines. This reproduces noticeably less detail than the 576 lines used for 4:3 broadcasts. A PALplus receiver can use extra information hidden in the black bars above and below the image to fully recover the 576 lines of vertical resolution.

For compatibility reasons, the horizontal bandwidth remains at 5.0 MHz. This means that a PALplus signal provides no extra horizontal resolution to compensate for the image being stretched across a wider screen. The result is a horizontal resolution that is 73% of the vertical resolution, or 51% when the Kell factor is ignored.

A special signal tells the receiver when PALplus is in use, and also whether the original content was interlaced ("Camera mode" or 50i) or progressive scanned ("Film mode" or 25p) - see List of broadcast video formats. An additional signal can enable a "Ghost Cancellation" feature.

A separate feature related to PALplus is Colour-plus, which improves colour decoding performance.

=== Extensions ===
The PALplus standard comprises three extensions to standard PAL:

==== Vertical helper ====
A broadcaster creates a PALplus signal by scaling an anamorphic 16:9 picture with 576 lines down to 432 lines, so that the picture appears letterboxed on a regular PAL TV set. For luminance, the scaling is done using a pair of matching low-pass and high-pass filters, with the low-pass result being the regular PAL compatible letterbox broadcast. One out of every 4 lines of the high-pass result is hidden in the remaining 144 black letterbox lines at the top and bottom of the picture, using the U colour subcarrier. The filtering is such that this is enough to restore the complete 576 line resolution. The use of the colour subcarrier means these signals appear as very dark blue and yellow patterns on black bars on a regular 4:3 PAL TV set.

The 16:9 PAL-plus receiver combines 432 normally visible lines plus 144 helper lines, restoring the original 576 lines. In "Film mode" (progressive scan), this operation is performed on a per-frame basis, while in "Camera mode" (interlaced) the operation is performed per-field.

==== Colour-plus (or Clean PAL) ====
The PAL colour carrier is modulated making use of correlation between 2 fields, in order to give a cleaner luminance/chrominance separation in the PALplus receiver. It is used with signals with high horizontal luminance frequencies (3 MHz) that share the spectrum with the chrominance signals. Colour pictures on both standard and PALplus receivers are enhanced.

For progressive "Film mode" material, "Fixed" Colour-Plus is used, as there is no motion between the image fields. For camera based images, "Motion Adaptive Color-Plus" (MACP) is used based on movement.

==== Signaling bits ====
A special WSS signal tells the receiver whether 4:3/16:9/PALplus is in use, and also whether the original content was interlaced ("Camera mode") or progressive scanned ("Film mode"). An additional signal can enable a "Ghost Cancellation" feature. The bandwidth of these bits is low enough to be recorded on VHS and allow the receiver to switch to the proper format.

== PALplus compatible sets ==
The standard permits using the mark "PALplus" if the vertical helper reconstruction is implemented, with Colour-plus being optional.

Some PALplus compatible sets:

- Grundig: MFW82-710/9, MFW82-720/9, MFW82-730/9 DVD, M82-169/9
- Nokia: Nokia 8297, Nokia 7297, Nokia 6197
- Philips: 28PW9525, 32PW9525, 36PW9525
- Schneider: Scinema 28-100T, Scinema 2810, Scinema 3000
- Sony: KV-W 3213D, KV-32W3(S)

PALplus set top decoders:

- Nokia 1724
- Philips: 22AV1012, 22AV1401

Most widescreen sets without any PALplus processing will switch the display format automatically between 4:3 and 16:9, based on the WSS signaling bits. These sets will simply zoom the centre 432 lines of the 16:9 letterboxed image to fill all of the 16:9 frame, without recovering any of the extra vertical line resolution.

== See also ==
- Clear-Vision (a similar system for NTSC broadcasts)
- HDTV
- DVB
- PAL
- Broadcast television systems
- Widescreen television
- Widescreen signaling
