= Clear-Vision =

Japanese analogue widescreen television broadcasting system

Clear-Vision is a Japanese EDTV (Extended Definition TV) television system introduced in the 1990s, that improves audio and video quality while remaining compatible with the existing broadcast standard. Developed to improve analog NTSC, it adds features like progressive scan, ghost cancellation and widescreen image format. A similar system named PALplus was developed in Europe with the goal of improving analog PAL broadcasts.

The initial version of the system was called IDTV (Improved Definition Television, or SuperNTSC) and was based on advanced signal processing on TV receivers. This allowed improvements such as progressive scan, ghost cancellation (reducing the effects of multipath propagation) and NTSC luminance and chroma crosstalk reduction (by way of filtering), without requiring any extra information being broadcast. These early studies were done by NTV, under the direction of the MPT (Ministry of Post and Telecommunications) and the BTA (Broadcasting Technology Association).

This early standard was published as ITU-R recommendation BT.797 - "CLEARVISION". Public broadcasting began on NTV in August 1989, under the name of EDTV-I or "Clear-Vision", ending on July 24, 2011.

Tests for an updated system known as EDTV-II or "Wide-aspect Clear-vision" started in 1994. EDTV-II supported 480p progressive scan, wide-screen and digital audio. Public broadcasting began in July 1995 by NTV. The standard was published as ARIB STD-B9 - "Direct Coding for EDTV-II Television Signal" in 1997 and as ITU BT.1298 - "Enhanced wide-screen NTSC TV transmission system".

EDTV-II broadcasts are displayed in letterbox format (with black bands on the top and bottom of the screen) on regular 4:3 NTSC receivers with no decoding ability. Information to reconstruct the original image signal is transmitted as helper signals - HH (horizontal high), VH (vertical high) and VT (vertical-temporal) - placed on the black bars. This solution is similar to the one used on PALplus, a comparable system to improve analog PAL broadcasts. On compatible TV sets, broadcasts are seen in 16:9 wide-screen retaining the full original 480 line resolution.

When introduced, EDTV-II was used on many shows by NTV such as Friday Road Show. At the time of TOKYO MX start in 1995, more than half of its broadcasts were in widescreen using EDTV-II, such as Tokyo NEWS. Interest was predicted to be high, with manufacturers such as Sony and Mitsubishi having 16 to 32'' widescreen EDTV-II compatible TVs available that same year. Yet, due to lack consumer interest, broadcasts returned to regular 4:3 over the years. NHK used the system occasionally, as it was more interested in promoting its own analog high-definition MUSE system. Widescreen EDTV-II broadcasts gradually disappeared, with World Heritage, broadcast by Sony, being the last show shown using the format.

Other than widescreen broadcasts, the system gave a limited improvement in image quality, mostly noticeable on larger TV sets. Yet these TVs benefited more from true HDTV broadcasts using the MUSE system, also available at the time. The system was replaced by ISDB digital broadcasts after 2012.

== Technical details ==
The EDTV-II "Clear-Vision" transmission system is based on the following elements:

- Vertical conversion of the original full resolution 480 lines widescreen image to a 360-line 16:9 letterbox picture. High and low-pass filters are used.
- Recovery of original vertical image resolution using helper signals (VH, VT). Taking advantage of the letterbox black bands, these are modulated on the color subcarrier, with visibility minimized on regular 4:3 televisions. The vertical helper (VH) carries the missing vertical luminance details in motionless portions of the picture. The vertical temporal helper (VT) carries information allowing the receiver to reconstruct the original progressive scanning.
- Recovery of original horizontal image resolution using a helper signal (HH), taking advantage of the “Fukinuki hole”. Horizontal luminance between 4.2 - 6 MHz is transmitted by frequency division multiplexing into the active area of the letterbox signal.
- A wide-screen signaling system, according to recommendations EIAJ CPX1204 / ITU BT.1119;
- The chrominance signal is transmitted in the active area of the letterbox (360 lines).

Some elements are optional, but the standard requires that at least one helper and the wide-screen signaling are used.

EDTV-II "Clear-Vision" technical details
Aspect Ratio	16:9 letterbox
Active area	360 lines
Black area	120 lines
Horizonal Resolution	0 - 4.2 MHz
Vertical Resolution	0 - 360 lines/height
Vertical High Resolution Helper (VH)	360 - 480 lines/height
Vertical-Temporal Helper (VT)	180 - 360 lines/height
Horizontal Helper (HH)	4.2 - 6.0 MHz
Scanning	576 lines progressive / interlaced

== See also ==
- PALplus (a similar system for PAL broadcasts)
- Improved-definition television
- Enhanced-definition television
- MUSE
- NTSC
- Broadcast television systems
- Widescreen television
- Widescreen signaling
