= Pixel aspect ratio =

Proportion between the width and the height of a pixel

Pixel aspect ratio 1:1

Pixel aspect ratio 2:1

A pixel aspect ratio (PAR) is a mathematical ratio that describes how the width of a pixel in a digital image compares to the height of that pixel.

Most digital imaging systems display an image as a grid of tiny, square pixels. However, some imaging systems, especially those that must be compatible with standard-definition television motion pictures, display an image as a grid of rectangular pixels, in which the pixel width and height are different. Pixel aspect ratio describes this difference.

Use of pixel aspect ratio mostly involves pictures pertaining to standard-definition television and some other exceptional cases. Most other imaging systems, including those that comply with SMPTE standards and practices, use square pixels.

PAR is also known as sample aspect ratio and abbreviated SAR, though it can be confused with storage aspect ratio.

== Introduction ==
The ratio of the width to the height of an image is known as the aspect ratio, or more precisely the display aspect ratio (DAR) – the aspect ratio of the image as displayed; for TV, DAR was traditionally 4:3 (a.k.a. fullscreen), with 16:9 (a.k.a. widescreen) now the standard for HDTV. In digital images, there is a distinction with the storage aspect ratio (SAR), which is the ratio of pixel dimensions. If an image is displayed with square pixels, then these ratios agree; if not, then non-square, "rectangular" pixels are used, and these ratios disagree. The aspect ratio of the pixels themselves is known as the pixel aspect ratio (PAR) – for square pixels this is 1:1 – and these are related by the identity:

SAR × PAR = DAR

Rearranging (solving for PAR) yields:

PAR = DAR / SAR

For example:

- A 640 × 480 VGA image has a SAR of 640/480 = 4:3, and if displayed on a 4:3 display (DAR = 4:3) has square pixels, hence a PAR of 1:1.
- By contrast, a 720 × 576 D-1 PAL image has a SAR of 720/576 = 5:4, but if displayed on a 4:3 display (DAR = 4:3) the PAR is 4/3 : 5/4 = 16:15 ≈ 1.066. This means that the pixels of the PAL picture must be "stretched" by this amount to fit in the 4:3 display.

In analog images such as film there is no notion of pixel, nor notion of SAR or PAR, but in the digitization of analog images the resulting digital image has pixels, hence SAR (and accordingly PAR, if displayed at the same aspect ratio as the original).

Non-square pixels arise often in early digital TV standards, related to digitalization of analog TV signals – whose vertical and "effective" horizontal resolutions differ and are thus best described by non-square pixels – and also in some digital video cameras and computer display modes, such as Color Graphics Adapter (CGA). Today they arise also in transcoding between resolutions with different SARs.

Actual displays do not generally have non-square pixels, though digital sensors might; they are rather a mathematical abstraction used in resampling images to convert between resolutions.

There are several complicating factors in understanding PAR, particularly as it pertains to digitization of analog video:

- First, analog video does not have pixels, but rather a raster scan, and thus has a well-defined vertical resolution (the lines of the raster), but not a well-defined horizontal resolution, since each line is an analog signal. However, by a standardized sampling rate, the effective horizontal resolution can be determined by the sampling theorem, as is done below.
- Second, due to overscan, some of the lines at the top and bottom of the raster are not visible, as are some of the possible image on the left and right – see Overscan: Analog to digital resolution issues. Also, the resolution may be rounded (DV NTSC uses 480 lines, rather than the 486 that are possible).
- Third, analog video signals are interlaced – each image (frame) is sent as two "fields", each with half the lines. Thus either the pixels are twice as tall as they would be without interlacing, or the image is deinterlaced.

== Background ==
Video is presented as a sequential series of images called video frames. Historically, video frames were created and recorded in analog form. As digital display technology, digital broadcast technology, and digital video compression evolved separately, it resulted in video frame differences that must be addressed using pixel aspect ratio. Digital video frames are generally defined as a grid of pixels used to present each sequential image. The horizontal component is defined by pixels (or samples), and is known as a video line. The vertical component is defined by the number of lines, as in 480 lines.

Standard-definition television standards and practices were developed as broadcast technologies and intended for terrestrial broadcasting, and were therefore not designed for digital video presentation. Such standards define an image as an array of well-defined horizontal "Lines", well-defined vertical "Line Duration" and a well-defined picture center. However, there is not a standard-definition television standard that properly defines image edges or explicitly demands a certain number of picture elements per line. Furthermore, analog video systems such as NTSC 480i and PAL 576i, instead of employing progressively displayed frames, employ fields or interlaced half-frames displayed in an interwoven manner to reduce flicker and double the image rate for smoother motion.

=== Analog-to-digital conversion ===
As a result of computers becoming powerful enough to serve as video editing tools, video digital-to-analog converters and analog-to-digital converters were made to overcome this incompatibility. To convert analog video lines into a series of square pixels, the industry adopted a default sampling rate at which luma values were extracted into pixels. The luma sampling rate for 480i pictures was 12 3/11 MHz and for 576i pictures was 14 3/4 MHz.

The term pixel aspect ratio was first coined when ITU-R BT.601 (commonly known as Rec. 601) specified that standard-definition television pictures are made of lines of exactly 720 non-square pixels. ITU-R BT.601 did not define the exact pixel aspect ratio but did provide enough information to calculate the exact pixel aspect ratio based on industry practices: The standard luma sampling rate of precisely 13 1/2 MHz. Based on this information:

- The pixel aspect ratio for 480i would be 10:11 as:
  $$12\tfrac{3}{11} \div 13\tfrac{1}{2} = \tfrac{10}{11}$$
- The pixel aspect ratio for 576i would be 59:54 as:
  $$14\tfrac{3}{4}  \div 13\tfrac{1}{2} = \tfrac{59}{54}$$

SMPTE RP 187 further attempted to standardize the pixel aspect ratio values for 480i and 576i. It designated 177:160 for 480i or 1035:1132 for 576i. However, due to significant difference with practices in effect by industry and the computational load that they imposed upon the involved hardware, SMPTE RP 187 was simply ignored. SMPTE RP 187 information annex A.4 further suggested the use of 10:11 for 480i.

As of this writing, ITU-R BT.601-6, which is the latest edition of ITU-R BT.601, still implies that the pixel aspect ratios mentioned above are correct.

=== Digital video processing ===
As stated above, ITU-R BT.601 specified that standard-definition television pictures are made of lines of 720 non-square pixels, sampled with a precisely specified sampling rate. A simple mathematical calculation reveals that a 704 pixel width would be enough to contain a 480i or 576i standard 4:3 picture:

- A 4:3 480-line picture, digitized with the Rec. 601-recommended sampling rate, would be 704 non-square pixels wide.
  $$\frac{x}{480}\times \frac{10}{11} = \frac{4}{3}\Rightarrow x = \frac{480\times 11\times 4}{10\times 3} = 704$$
- A 4:3 576-line picture, digitized with the Rec. 601-recommended sampling rate, would be 702 54/59 non-square pixels wide.
  $$\frac{x}{576}\times \frac{59}{54} = \frac{4}{3}\Rightarrow x = \frac{576\times 54\times 4}{59\times 3} = 702\tfrac{54}{59}$$

Unfortunately, not all standard TV pictures are exactly 4:3: As mentioned earlier, in analog video, the center of a picture is well-defined but the edges of the picture are not standardized. As a result, some analog devices (mostly PAL devices but also some NTSC devices) generated motion pictures that were horizontally (slightly) wider. This also proportionately applies to anamorphic widescreen (16:9) pictures. Therefore, to maintain a safe margin of error, ITU-R BT.601 required sampling 16 more non-square pixels per line (8 more at each edge) to ensure saving all video data near the margins.

This requirement, however, had implications for PAL motion pictures. PAL pixel aspect ratios for standard (4:3) and anamorphic wide screen (16:9), respectively 59:54 and 118:81, were awkward for digital image processing, especially for mixing PAL and NTSC video clips. Therefore, video editing products chose the almost equivalent values, respectively 12:11 and 16:11, which were more elegant and could create PAL digital images at exactly 704 pixels wide, as illustrated:

- For PAL 4:3:
  $$\frac{4}{3}\div \frac{704}{576} = \color{blue}{\frac{12}{11}}$$
- For PAL 16:9:
  $$\frac{16}{9}\div \frac{704}{576} = \color{blue}{\frac{16}{11}}$$

== Inconsistency in defined pixel aspect ratio values ==
Commonly found on the Internet and in various other published media are numerous sources that introduce different and highly incompatible values as the pixel aspect ratios of various video pictures and video systems. (See the Supplementary sources section.)

To neutrally judge the accuracy and/or feasibility of these sources, please note that as the digital motion picture was invented years after the traditional motion picture, all video pictures targeted for standard definition television and compatible media, digital or otherwise, have (and must have) specifications compatible with standard definition television. Therefore, the pixel aspect ratio of digital video must be calculated from the specification of common traditional equipment rather than the specifications of digital video. Otherwise, any pixel aspect ratio that is calculated from a digital video source is only usable in certain cases for the same kind of video sources and cannot be considered/used as a general pixel aspect ratio of any standard definition television system.

In addition, unlike digital video that has well-defined picture edges, traditional video systems have never standardized a well-defined edge for the picture. Therefore, the pixel aspect ratio of common standard television systems cannot be calculated based on edges of pictures. Such a calculated aspect ratio value would not be entirely wrong, but also cannot be considered as the general pixel aspect ratio of any specific video system. The use of such values would be restricted only to certain cases.

== Modern standards and practices ==
In modern digital imaging systems and high-definition televisions, especially those that comply with SMPTE standards and practices, only square pixels are used for broadcast and display. However, some formats (ex., HDV, DVCPRO HD) use non-square pixels internally for image storage, as a way to reduce the amount of data that must be processed, thus limiting the necessary transfer rates and maintaining compatibility with existing interfaces.

== Issues of non-square pixels ==
Directly mapping an image with a certain pixel aspect ratio on a device whose pixel aspect ratio is different makes the image look unnaturally stretched or squashed in either the horizontal or vertical direction. For example, a circle generated for a computer display with square pixels looks like a vertical ellipse on a standard-definition NTSC television that uses vertically rectangular pixels. This issue is more evident on wide-screen TVs.

Pixel aspect ratio must be taken into consideration by video editing software products that edit video files with non-square pixels, especially when mixing video clips with different pixel aspect ratios. This would be the case when creating a video montage from various cameras employing different video standards (a relatively rare situation). Special effects software products must also take the pixel aspect ratio into consideration, since some special effects require calculation of the distances from a certain point so that they look visually correct. An example of such effects would be radial blur, motion blur, or even a simple image rotation.

== Use of pixel aspect ratio ==
Pixel aspect ratio value is used mainly in digital video software, where motion pictures must be converted or reconditioned to use video systems other than the original. The video player software may use pixel aspect ratio to properly render digital video on screen. Video editing software uses pixel aspect ratio to properly scale and render a video into a new format.

The pixel aspect ratio support is also required to display, without distortion, legacy digital images from computer standards and video-games what existed in the 80s. In that generation, square pixels were too expensive to produce, so machines and video cards like the SNES, CGA, EGA, Hercules, C64, MSX, PC-88, X68000 etc had non-square pixels.

== Confusion with display aspect ratio ==
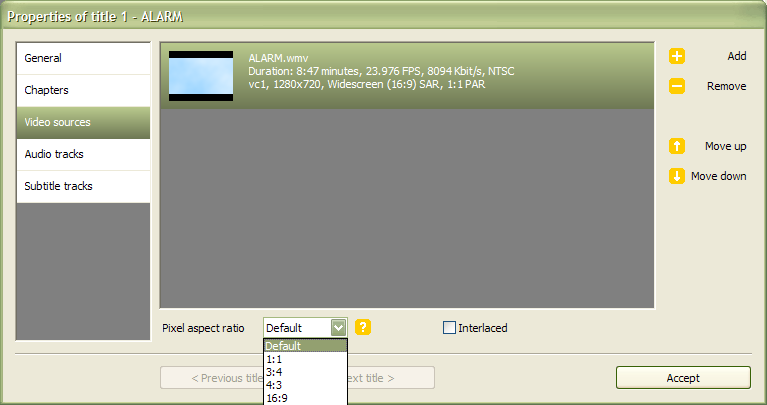
DVD Flick 1.3.0.7: Example of a computer program that has mislabeled picture aspect ratio as pixel aspect ratio

Pixel aspect ratio is often confused with different types of image aspect ratios; the ratio of the image width and height. Due to non-squareness of pixels in Standard-definition TV, there are two types of such aspect ratios: storage aspect ratio (SAR) and display aspect ratio (abbreviated DAR, also known as image aspect ratio and picture aspect ratio). Also, pixel aspect ratio (PAR) is also known as sample aspect ratio (abbreviated SAR) in some industrial standards (such as H.264) and output of programs (such as ffmpeg). Note the reuse of the abbreviations PAR and SAR. This article uses only the terms pixel aspect ratio, display aspect ratio and storage aspect ratio to avoid ambiguity.

Storage aspect ratio is the ratio of the image width to height in pixels, and can be easily calculated from the video file. Display aspect ratio is the ratio of image width to height (in a unit of length such as centimeters or inches) when displayed on screen, and is calculated from the combination of pixel aspect ratio and storage aspect ratio.

However, users who know the definition of these concepts may get confused as well. Poorly crafted user-interfaces or poorly written documentations can easily cause such confusion: Some video-editing software applications often ask users to specify an "aspect ratio" for their video file, presenting him or her with the choices of "4:3" and "16:9". Sometimes, these choices may be "PAL 4:3", "NTSC 4:3", "PAL 16:9" and "NTSC 16:9". In such situations, the video editing program is implicitly asking for the pixel aspect ratio of the video file by asking for information about the video system from which the video file originated. The program then uses a table (similar to the one below) to determine the correct pixel aspect ratio value.

Generally speaking, to avoid confusion, it can be assumed that video editing products never ask for the storage aspect ratio as they can directly retrieve or calculate it. Non-square-pixel–aware applications also need only to ask for either pixel aspect ratio or display aspect ratio, from either of which they can calculate the other.

== Pixel aspect ratios of common video formats ==
Pixel aspect ratio values for common standard-definition video formats are listed below. Note that for PAL video formats, two different types of pixel aspect ratio values are listed:

1. Rec.601, a Rec.601-compliant value, which is considered the real pixel aspect ratio of standard-definition video of that type.
2. Digital, which is roughly equivalent to Rec.601 and is more suitable to use in Digital Video Editing software.

Note that sources differ on PARs for common formats – for example, 576 lines (PAL) displayed at 4:3 (DAR) corresponds to either PAR of 12:11 (if 704×576, SAR = 11:9), or a PAR of 16:15 (if 720×576, SAR = 5:4). See references for sources giving both, and SDTV: Resolution for a table of storage, display and pixel aspect ratios. Also note that CRT televisions do not have pixels, but scanlines.

Non-square aspect ratios of common video formats
| Video system | DAR | Picture dimensions (px × px) | SAR | PAR | PAR (decimal) | Width (px) | Type |
|---|---|---|---|---|---|---|---|
| PAL | 4∶3 | 704 × 576 | 72∶59 (Note: SAR = DAR : PAR = 4/3 : 59/54 = 72/59 (But it is still not explained why 704 × 576 can have two Storage Aspect Ratios: 11:9 and 72:59)) | 59∶54 | 1.09̅2̅5̅ | 769, 385 | Rec.601 |
| PAL | 4∶3 | 704 × 576 | 11∶9 | 12∶11 | 1.0̅9̅ | 768, 384 | digital |
| PAL | 4∶3 | 720 × 576 | 5∶4 | 16∶15 | 1.06̅ | 768, 384 | digital |
| PAL | 16∶9 | 704 × 576 | 72∶59 (Note: SAR = DAR : PAR = 16/9 : 118/81 = 72/59) | 118∶81 | 1.4̅5̅6̅7̅9̅0̅1̅2̅3̅ | 1026, 513 | Rec.601 |
| PAL | 16∶9 | 704 × 576 | 11∶9 | 16∶11 | 1.4̅5̅ | 1024, 512 | digital |
| PAL | 16∶9 | 720 × 576 | 5∶4 | 64∶45 | 1.42̅ | 1024, 512 | digital |
| NTSC | 4∶3 | 704 × 480 | 22∶15 | 10∶11 | 0.9̅0̅ | 640, 320 | digital |
| NTSC | 16∶9 | 704 × 480 | 22∶15 | 40∶33 | 1.2̅1̅ | 853, 427 | digital |
| HDV / HDCAM | 16∶9 | 1440 × 1080 | 4∶3 | 4∶3 | 1.3̅ | 1920 | digital |

Sample aspect ratios with predefined indicators in the H.26x family of video codecs
| Index | Aspect ratio |
|---|---|
| 0 | unspecified |
| 1 | 1∶1 |
| 2 | 12∶11 |
| 3 | 10∶11 |
| 4 | 16∶11 |
| 5 | 40∶33 |
| 6 | 24∶11 |
| 7 | 20∶11 |
| 8 | 32∶11 |
| 9 | 80∶33 |
| 10 | 18∶11 |
| 11 | 15∶11 |
| 12 | 64∶33 |
| 13 | 160∶99 |
| 14 | 4∶3 |
| 15 | 3∶2 |
| 16 | 2∶1 |
| 255 | extended |
