= 14:9 aspect ratio =

Television image format

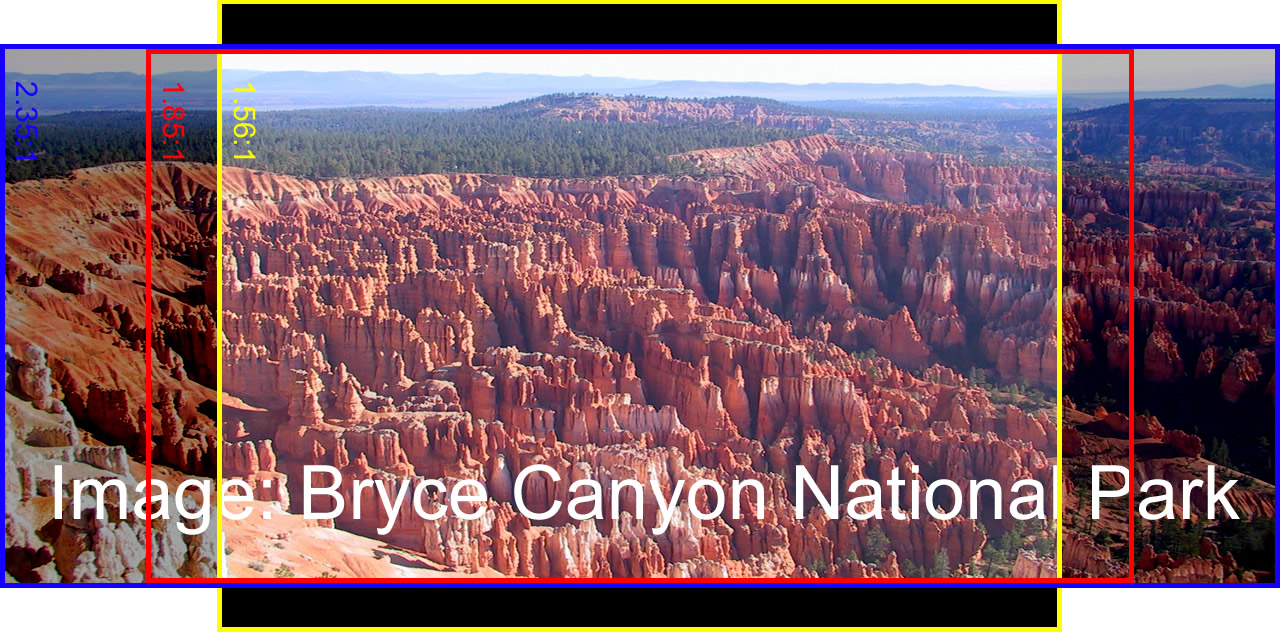
The red outline frames an approximately 16:9 picture. The yellow outline, not including the black bars at top and bottom, shows the same picture cropped to 14:9, while the whole yellow box frames a 4:3 picture.

14:9 (1.5̅:1) is a compromise aspect ratio between 4:3 and 16:9. It is used to create an acceptable picture on both 4:3 and 16:9 TV, conceived following audience tests conducted by the BBC. It has been used by most UK, Irish, French, Spanish, Colombian and Australian terrestrial analogue networks, and in the US on Warner Bros. Discovery' HD simulcast channels with programming and advertising originally compiled in 4:3. Note that 14:9 is not a shooting format; 14:9 material is almost always derived from either a 16:9 or 4:3 shot.

== Usage ==
=== With native 16:9 material ===
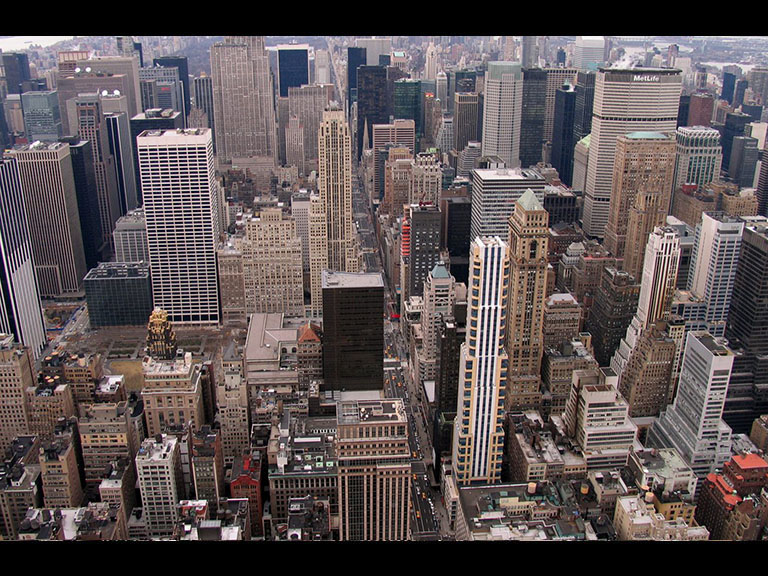
14:9 letterbox as broadcast in 4:3: the sides of the image are cropped to 14:9 and narrow black bars are added to the top and bottom.

A common usage is for material shot in 16:9 format. During production, the important action is kept within the centre of the picture, known as the 14:9 safe area. When the material is broadcast in a 4:3 format (such as for analog television), the sides of the image are cropped to 14:9 and narrow black bars are added to the top and bottom. It is considered that viewers who are not used to wide-screen will find this less distracting than the letterbox format that would result from broadcasting the full 16:9 picture in analogue, while still seeing more of the picture than would be visible if cropped into 4:3. When the same material is broadcast in 16:9 (such as for digital television), the full 16:9 frame is left intact, but widescreen signaling auxiliary signals tell the receiver that the picture is suitable for cropping to 14:9 if necessary (for example, when the receiver is connected to a 4:3 display).

The major benefit in shooting 16:9 with protection for 14:9 (rather than 4:3) is improving the usable screen area for titles, logos and scrolling text. The visible enhancement is significant due to the restrictive requirements of overscan. When shooting in 16:9 for potential 4:3 distribution, the "Shoot And Protect" method (from the BBC's "Widescreen Book") is employed. As the name suggests, footage is shot in 16:9 but important visual information is protected inside the 14:9 or 4:3 safe areas.

=== With native 4:3 material ===
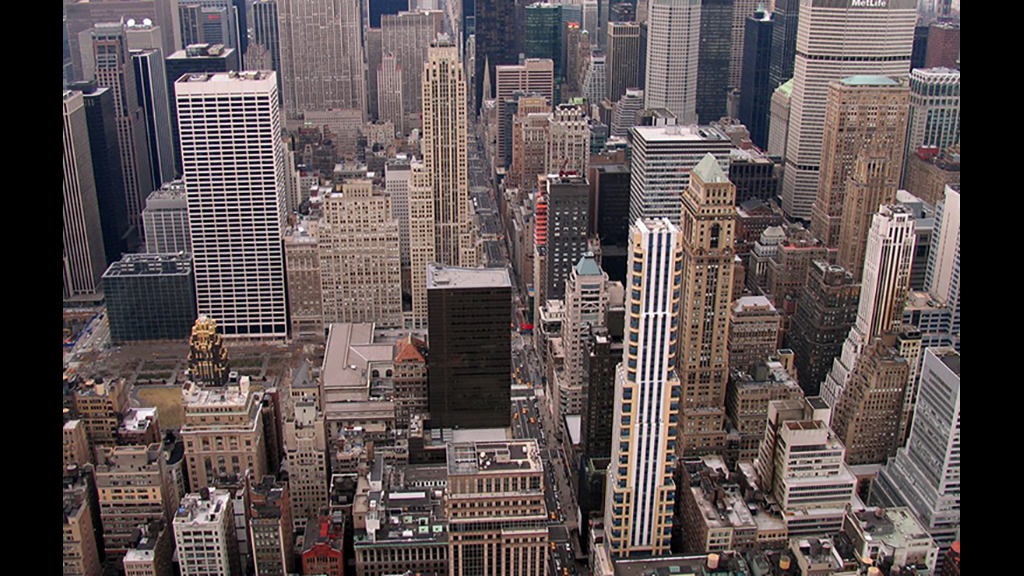
14:9 pillarbox as broadcast in 16:9: the top and bottom of the image are cropped to 14:9, and black bars are added to either side.

Another use is for material shot on a 4:3 format. When broadcast in 16:9, the top and bottom of the original frame are cropped to 14:9, and black bars (called pillarboxes) are added to either side. When broadcast in 4:3, the 14:9 crop is often used in preference to the original 4:3 frame. This is especially common when 4:3 footage needs to be included in an otherwise 16:9 program, such as a news broadcast, and was used in the 2000s by the BBC's children's channels (CBBC & CBeebies) to broadcast older children's programming shot in 4:3 on a larger proportion of a 16:9 screen.

=== Adoption by TV channels ===
Viacom International Media Networks Europe uses 14:9 for its music videos that are in 4:3. Nearly all of VIMN Europe's music channels around Europe (with the exception of MTV 80s and the now-defunct VH1 Classic and MTV Classic Italy) transitioned to widescreen from 2011 until 2015, all of the 4:3 music videos are cropped to 14:9 (with the exception of the now-defunct MTV Adria, where all of the 4:3 music videos were stretched horizontally to 16:9). From 2020 on MTV Latin America 4:3 music videos will be broadcast in 14:9 aspect ratio.

JimJam also uses 14:9 for reruns of classic children's programming as well.

==== Philippines ====
CNN Philippines was the first Philippine TV channel to air in 14:9 until April 2017, when it was later transitioned to 16:9. It was followed by ANC, IBC (until March 2022), PTV, and SMNI (until May 2017).

==== UK ====
In the UK, most channels broadcast in 16:9. On Nick UK, the 14:9 cropping is used on adverts and shows which were produced in 16:9, such as House of Anubis, iCarly, Victorious and Big Time Rush, to present a more consistent output. Nick UK, along with its sister channels Nick Jr. UK and Nicktoons UK, were the only children's channels that were not shown in 16:9, but made the switch in 2013 (With Nicktoons UK remaining in 4:3 until February 2017). The HD channel, Nick HD UK, was already shown in 16:9 before this, with 4:3 programming shown in the pillarbox effect.

==== US ====
The primary use of 14:9 in the US was for full screen channels in the 2000s to show content that had been produced in 16:9. One major show to receive this treatment was Star Trek: Enterprise.

The use of 14:9 to adapt full screen content for widescreen channels, by contrast, is much less common in the US, where pillarboxing and stretching are more commonly used (stretching is primarily used by Turner's Flexview). Only the HD simulcast channels of Warner Bros. Discovery used 14:9 for its previous episodes of their productions. Weigel Broadcasting uses 14:9 extensively as a compromise format on older shows without widescreen versions airing on their networks, including Catchy Comedy, Heroes & Icons, MeTV, Movies!, and Start TV. Some television networks use it on a more selective basis, with AMC and Sundance TV using it when showing episodes of M*A*S*H. The first disc of MythBusters: Big Blast Collection uses this ratio, as does the Mega Movie Myths disc.

==== Argentina ====
It is also used on the ISDB-Tb HD service of the Argentinian public television, TV Pública, in order to adjust their old programs and 4:3 SD studio cameras to 16:9 format.

==== Portugal ====
The public broadcaster RTP used the 14:9 format to convert 16:9 broadcasts to the 4:3 format it still used until 2013 (for the majority of the programs broadcast). However, since 8 June 2012, they began to broadcast 16:9 material in its original aspect ratio, with the correct flag, thus ending the broadcasts featuring the 14:9 format and since January 2013, the majority of broadcasts are in 16:9 (since late 2017 downscaled from the native HD feed). Private broadcaster TVI started using the 14:9 format in August 2012 to broadcast 16:9 material instead of using 4:3 Pan & Scan, as they refused to broadcast in 16:9. However, on 3 October 2015, it began to broadcast in full widescreen.

==== Turkey ====
From 2005 to 2011, TRT broadcast (except TRT HD) Eurovision Song Contest by cropping to 14:9. Many channels of TRT were broadcasting 4:3 at the time; narrow black bars are added to the top and bottom.

== Mathematics ==
The aspect ratio of 14:9 (1.555...) is the arithmetic mean (average) of 16:9 and 4:3 (12:9), $((16/9) + (12/9)) \div 2 = 14/9$. More practically, it is approximately the geometric mean (the precise geometric mean is $\sqrt{(16/9)\times (4/3)} \approx 1.5396 \approx 13.8:9$), and in this sense is mathematically a compromise between these two aspect ratios: two equal area pictures (at 16:9 and 4:3) will intersect in a box with aspect ratio the geometric mean, as demonstrated in the image at top (14:9 is just slightly wider than the intersection). In this way 14:9 balances the needs of both 16:9 and 4:3, cropping or distorting both about equally. Similar considerations were used in the choice of 16:9 by the SMPTE, which balanced 2.35:1 and 4:3.

== See also ==
- Shoot and protect
- Pillarbox
- Widescreen signaling
