= 16:9 aspect ratio =

Aspect ratio with a width of 16 units and height of 9 units

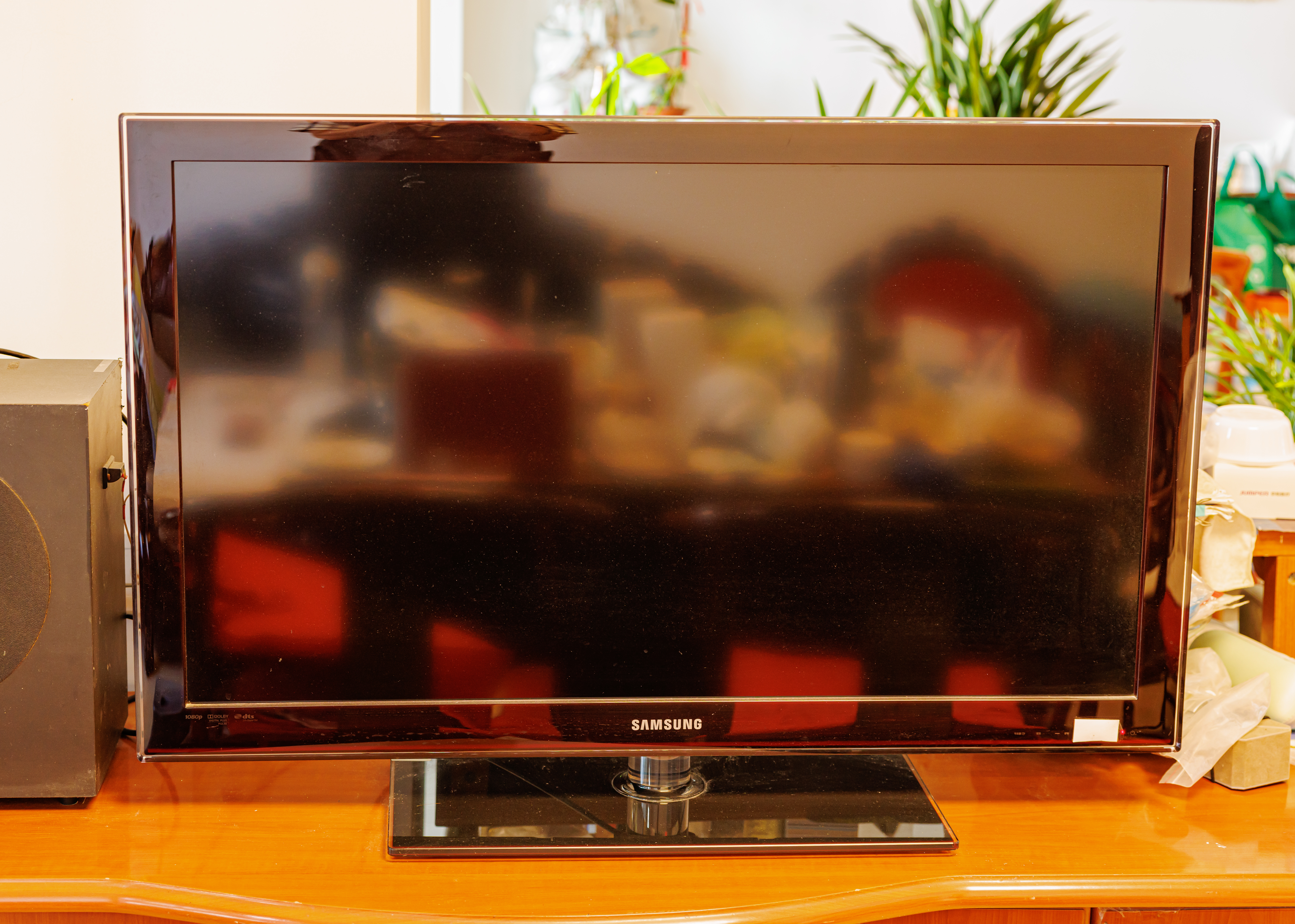
A television with the 16:9 image ratio

16:9 (1.7̅:1) or sixteen-nine is an aspect ratio with a width of 16 units and height of 9 units. Once seen as an exotic aspect ratio, since 1999, it has become the most common aspect ratio for televisions and computer monitors, and is also the standard aspect ratio for the UHD, 4K and 8K formats. 16:9 is the widescreen standard format and Wide-aspect Clear-vision. Japan's Hi-Vision originally started with a 15:9 ratio but converted when the international standards group introduced the wider ratio 16:9. Many digital video cameras have the capability to record in 16:9. It is the only aspect ratio natively supported by Blu-ray, but Blu-ray producers can also choose to show even a wider ratio such as 2.40:1 within the 16:9 frame adding Letterbox black bars within the image itself.

== History ==
Derivation of the 16:9 aspect ratio The main figure shows 4:3 and 2.40:1 rectangles with the same area A, and 16:9 rectangles that covers (black) or is common to (grey) them. The calculation considers the extreme rectangles, where m and n are multipliers to maintain their respective aspect ratios and areas.

Kerns H. Powers, a member of the SMPTE Working Group on High-Definition Electronic Production, first proposed the 16:9 (1.77̅:1) aspect ratio in 1984. The popular choices in 1980 were 4:3 (based on TV standard's ratio at the time), 15:9 (5:3) (the European "flat" 1.66̅:1 ratio), 1.85:1 (the American "flat" ratio) and 2.35:1 (the CinemaScope/Panavision) ratio for anamorphic widescreen.

Powers cut out rectangles with equal areas, shaped to match each of the popular aspect ratios. When overlapped with their center points aligned, he found that all of those aspect ratio rectangles fit within an outer rectangle with an aspect ratio of 1.77̅:1 and all of them also covered a smaller common inner rectangle with the same aspect ratio 1.78:1. The value found by Powers is exactly the geometric mean of the extreme aspect ratios, 4:3 and 2.40:1, $\textstyle \sqrt{\frac{47}{15}}$ ≈ 1.77 which is coincidentally close to 16:9. Applying the same geometric mean technique to 16:9 and 4:3 yields an aspect ratio of around 1.54:1, sometimes approximated as 14:9 (1.55̅:1), which is likewise used as a compromise between these ratios.

While 16:9 (1.77̅:1) was initially selected as a compromise format, the subsequent popularity of HD broadcast has solidified 16:9 as perhaps the most common video aspect ratio in use. Most 4:3 (1.33̅:1) and 21:9 video is now recorded using a "shoot and protect" technique that keeps the main action within a 16:9 (1.77̅:1) inner rectangle to facilitate 16:9 conversion and viewing. Conversely it is quite common to use a technique known as center-cutting, to approach the challenge of presenting material shot (typically 16:9) to both an HD and legacy 4:3 audience simultaneously without having to compromise image size for either audience. Content creators frame critical content or graphics to fit within the 1.33:1 raster space. This has similarities to a filming technique called open matte.

In 1993, the European Union instituted the 16:9 Action Plan, to accelerate the development of the advanced television services in 16:9 aspect ratio, both in PALplus (compatible with regular PAL broadcasts) and also in HD-MAC (an early HD format). The Community fund for the 16:9 Action Plan amounted to €228,000,000.

Over a long period in the late 2000s and early 2010s, the computer industry switched from 4:3 to 16:10 (1.60:1) and then to 16:9 as the most common aspect ratio for monitors and laptops. A 2008 report by DisplaySearch cited a number of reasons for this shift, including the ability for PC and monitor manufacturers to expand their product ranges by offering products with wider screens and higher resolutions, helping consumers to more easily adopt such products and "stimulating the growth of the notebook PC and LCD monitor market". By using the same aspect ratio for both TVs and monitors, manufacturing can be streamlined and research costs reduced by not requiring two separate sets of equipment, and since a 16:9 is narrower than a 16:10 panel of the same length, more panels can be created per sheet of glass.

In 2011, Bennie Budler, product manager of IT products at Samsung South Africa, confirmed that monitors with a native resolution of 1920 × 1200 were not being manufactured anymore. "It is all about reducing manufacturing costs. The new 16:9 aspect ratio panels are more cost-effective to manufacture locally than the previous 16:10 panels".

In March 2011, the 16:9 resolution 1920 × 1080 became the most common used resolution among Steam's users. The previous most common resolution was 1680 × 1050 (16:10). By July 2022, Steam reported 16:9 resolutions were used by 77% of its users (1920 × 1080 with 67%; 2560 × 1440 with 10%).

== Properties ==
16:9 is the only widescreen aspect ratio natively supported by the DVD format. An anamorphic PAL region DVD video frame has a maximum resolution of 720 × 576p, but a video player software will stretch this to 1024 × 576p.

Producers can also choose to show even wider ratios such as 1.85:1 and 2.4:1 within the 16:9 DVD frame by hard matting or adding black bars within the image itself. Some films which were made in a 1.85:1 aspect ratio, such as the U.S.-Italian co-production Man of La Mancha and Kenneth Branagh's Much Ado About Nothing, fit quite comfortably onto a 1.77̅:1 HDTV screen and have been issued as an enhanced version on DVD without the black bars. Many digital video cameras also have the capability to record in 16:9.

=== Common resolutions ===
Width	Height	Name
256	144	Low quality
427	240	NTSC widescreen
480	270	Cropped 4:3 360p to 16:9
640	360	nHD
854	480	FWVGA
960	540	qHD
1024	576	WSVGA
1280	720	HD
1366	768	FWXGA
1600	900	HD+
1920	1080	Full HD
2048	1152	QWXGA
2560	1440	QHD
3200	1800	QHD+
3840	2160	4K UHD
5120	2880	5K
7680	4320	8K
15360	8640	16K
30720	17280	32K

== See also ==
- Display aspect ratio
- Videos with display aspect ratio 16:9 on Commons
- Display resolution
- 1080p
- 2160p
- 4320p
