= 16K resolution =

Video or display resolutions with a width of around 16,000 pixels

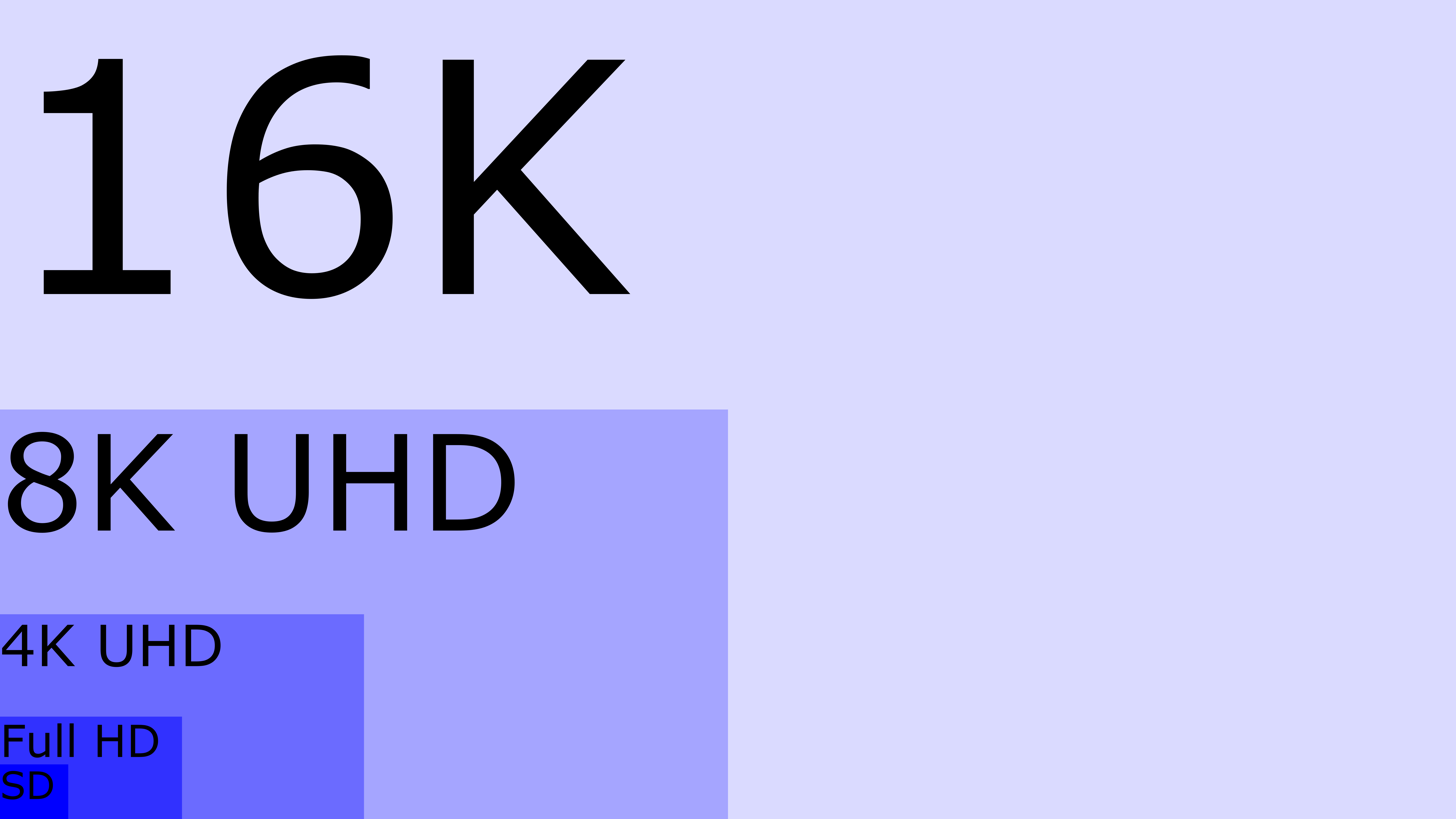
Comparison of 16K with smaller display resolutions

16K resolution is a display resolution with approximately 16,000 pixels horizontally. The most commonly discussed 16K resolution as of 2026 is 15360 × 8640, which doubles the pixel count of 8K UHD in each dimension, for a total of four times as many pixels. This resolution has 132.7 megapixels, which is 16 times as many pixels as 4K resolution and 64 times as many as 1080p.

As of October 2026, 16K resolutions can only be run in prototype displays, large public displays such as the Vegas Sphere use multi-monitor setups with AMD Eyefinity, or Nvidia Surround or Mosaic technology.

== History ==
Example video in 16K (16000 × 9000 pixels)

A VR video in 16K (16000 × 8000 pixels)

In early 2014, Japanese companies Nest+Visual, Sony and Indy Associates produced the first 16K film, using a Sony F65 CineAlta camera equipped with an anamorphic lens. The film was presented in March 2014 on a multi-screen video display at the Tokyo International Airport in Haneda, Japan.

In 2016, AMD announced a target for their future graphics cards to support 16K resolution with a refresh rate of 240 Hz for "true immersion" in VR.

Linus Tech Tips released a series of videos in 2017 attempting to play video games at 16K using sixteen 4K monitors.

In 2018, US filmmaker Martin Lisius released a short time-lapse film titled, "Prairie Wind" that he produced using a 2-camera Canon EOS 5DS system he developed. Two still images were stitched together to create one 15985 × 5792 pixel image and then rendered as 16K resolution video with an extremely wide aspect ratio of 2.76∶1. This is among the first known 16K videos to exist.

Innolux displayed the world's first 100-inch 16K (15360 × 8640) display module at Touch Taiwan in August 2018.

Sony introduced a 64 by 18 foot (19.5 m × 5.5 m) commercial 16K display at NAB 2019 that is set to be released in Japan. It is made up of 576 modules (each 360 × 360) in a formation of 48 by 12 modules, forming a 17280 × 4320 screen with a 4∶1 aspect ratio.

On June 26, 2019, VESA formally released the DisplayPort 2.0 standard with support for one 16K (15360 × 8640-pixel) display supporting 30-bit-per-pixel 4:4:4 RGB/Y′C_{B}C_{R}-color HDR video at a refresh rate of 60 Hz using DSC video compression.

Sphere, an entertainment venue located in Las Vegas, Nevada, opened with a wraparound interior LED screen on September 29, 2023. According to Sphere Entertainment, the screen within the theater is 160,000 sq ft (15,000 m^{2}) and supports a 16K (16000 × 16000-pixel) resolution, making it the highest resolution LED screen in the world.

At "Display Week" 2023, Chinese manufacturer BOE unveiled the world's first 110-inch 16K consumer television. The LCD-based screen outputs a native resolution of 15360×8640 pixels, which is four times the pixel count of 8K and sixteen times that of 4K. Operating at a 60 Hz refresh rate, the television delivers a brightness of 400 nits and a contrast ratio of 1200:1.

== See also ==
- 1080p Full HD – digital video format with a resolution of 1920 × 1080, with vertical resolution of 1080 lines
- 1440p (WQHD) – vertical resolution of 1440 lines
- List of 4K video recording devices
- 2K resolution – digital video formats with a horizontal resolution of around 2,000 pixels
- 5K resolution – digital video formats with a horizontal resolution of around 5,000 pixels, aimed at non-television computer monitor usage
- 6K resolution – digital video formats with a horizontal resolution of around 6,000 pixels, aimed at non-television computer monitor usage
- 8K resolution – digital video formats with a horizontal resolution of around 8,000 pixels
- 10K resolution – digital video formats with a horizontal resolution of around 10,000 pixels
- 32K resolution
- Aspect ratio (image) – proportional relationship between an image's width and height
- Digital cinema
- Display resolution standards
- High Efficiency Video Coding (HEVC) – video standard that supports 4K & 8K UHDTV and resolutions up to 8192 × 4320
- Rec. 2020 – ITU-R recommendation for UHDTV, defining formats with resolutions of 4K (3840 × 2160) and 8K (7680 × 4320)
- High-definition television (HDTV) – digital video formats with resolutions of 1280 × 720 or 1920 × 1080
- Graphics display resolution
- Sphere (venue), an entertainment venue with the world's first 16k resolution LED screen
- Postcard from Earth, a film shot in 18k resolution to display at Sphere
- Ultrawide formats
- Virtual reality
