= 10K resolution =

Video or display resolutions with a width of around 10,000 pixels

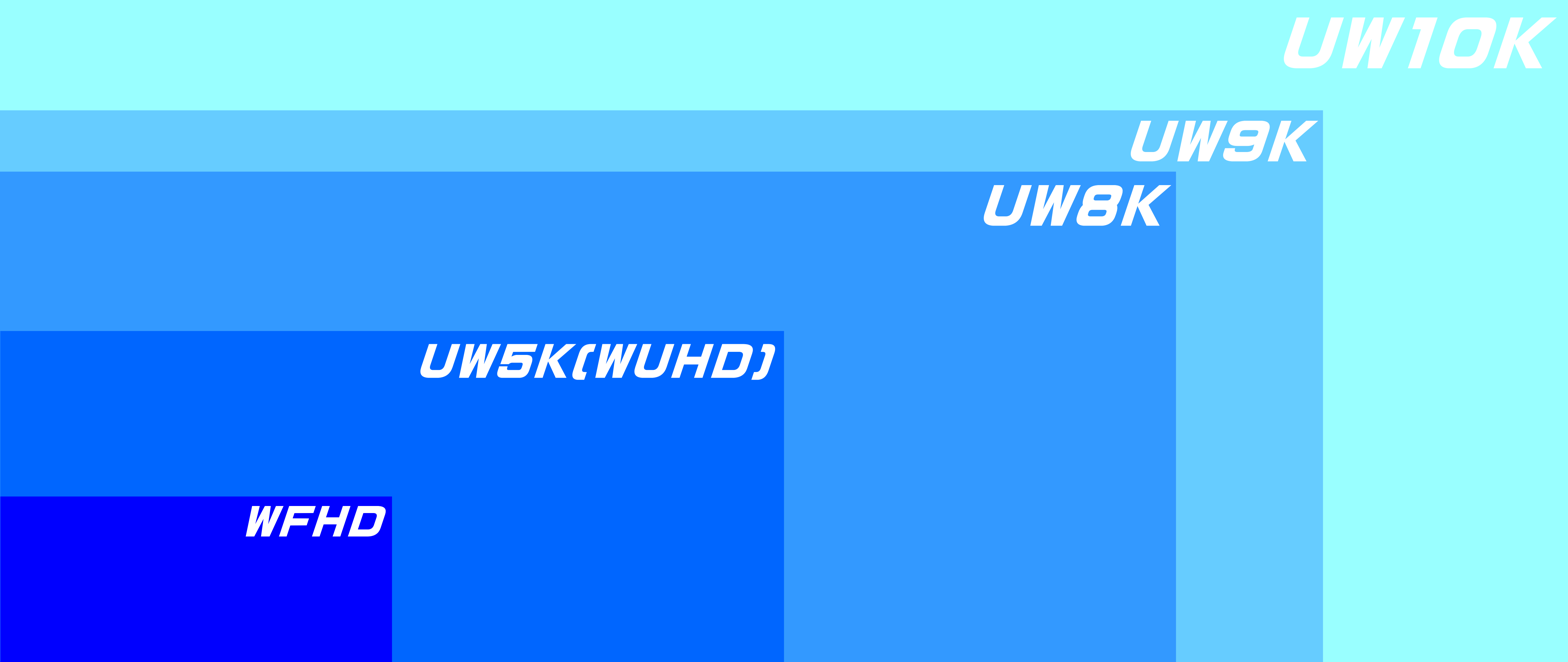
Resolution of WFHD, UW5K (WUHD), UW8K, UW9K, UW10K

10K resolution refers to a horizontal display resolutions of approximately 10,000 pixels. Unlike 4K UHD and 8K UHD, there are no 10K resolutions defined in the UHDTV broadcast standard. The first 10K displays demonstrated were ultrawide "21:9" screens with a resolution of 10240 × 4320, the same vertical resolution as 8K UHD.

== History ==
On June 5, 2015, Chinese manufacturer BOE showed a 10K display with an aspect ratio of 64:27 (≈21:9) and a resolution of 10240 × 4320.

In November 2016, the Consumer Technology Association published CTA-861-G, an update to their standard for digital video transmission formats. This revision added support for 10240 × 4320, a 10K resolution with an aspect ratio of 64:27 (≈21:9), at up to 120 Hz.

On January 4, 2017, HDMI version 2.1 was officially announced, and was later released on November 28, 2017. HDMI 2.1 includes support for all the formats listed in the CTA-861-G standard, including 10K (10240 × 4320) at up to 120 Hz. HDMI 2.1 specifies a new Ultra High Speed HDMI cable which supports a bandwidth of up to 48 Gbit/s. Display Stream Compression (DSC) 1.2a is used for video formats higher than 8K resolution with 4:2:0 chroma subsampling.

10K resolutions are also sometimes seen in the case of gaming, for instance high resolution screenshots in the case of Minecraft with the OptiFine mod.

== Cameras ==
As of 2021, there are multiple companies producing photo cameras capable of 10K and higher resolutions, such as Phase One, Fujifilm, Hasselblad, and Sony. Other companies also create sensors capable of 10K resolution, though they are mostly not available to the general public, and are often used for scientific or industrial purposes.

Blackmagic Design is the only company producing a video camera capable of filming in resolutions 10K or higher with their URSA Mini Pro 12K, and URSA Cine 12K & 17K.

== See also ==
- 1080p Full HD – digital video format with a resolution of 1920 × 1080, with vertical resolution of 1080 lines
- 1440p (WQHD) – vertical resolution of 1440 lines
- List of 4K video recording devices
- 2K resolution – digital video formats with a horizontal resolution of around 2,000 pixels
- 5K resolution – digital video formats with a horizontal resolution of around 5,000 pixels, aimed at non-television computer monitor usage
- 6K resolution – digital video formats with a horizontal resolution of around 6,000 pixels, aimed at non-television computer monitor usage
- 8K resolution – digital video formats with a horizontal resolution of around 8,000 pixels
- 16K resolution – experimental VR format
- 32K resolution
- Aspect ratio (image) – proportional relationship between an image's width and height
- Digital cinema
- Display resolution standards
- High Efficiency Video Coding (HEVC) – video standard that supports 4K & 8K UHDTV and resolutions up to 8192 × 4320
- Rec. 2020 – ITU-R recommendation for UHDTV, defining formats with resolutions of 4K (3840 × 2160) and 8K (7680 × 4320)
- Ultrawide formats
