= 32K resolution =

Type of computer resolution

For comparison: this image has a 32K resolution; spherical panoramics are one possible purpose for 32K

32K resolution refers to a display resolution of approximately 32,000 pixels horizontally. A resolution of 30720 × 17280 for an aspect ratio of 16:9 is speculated to be standardized. This doubles the pixel count of 16K in each dimension, for a total of 530.8 megapixels (530,841,600 pixels), 4 times as many pixels as the 16K resolution. It has 16 times as many pixels as 8K resolution, 64 times as many pixels as 4K resolution, 256 times the pixels as Full HD or 1080p resolution, and 576 times the pixels as HD or 720p resolution.

According to scientist and photographer Roger N. Clark, the theoretical maximum resolution of the human eye (assuming 20/20 vision) is approximately 576 megapixels if assuming only a 120 degree field of view, which is 32K resolution exactly at 32000 × 18000. However, the human eye's actual field of view is about 180 degrees. Per Clark's formula, the human eye's actual maximum resolution therefore equals 180 * 180 * 60 * 60 / (0.3 * 0.3), which is 1,296MP. For only a single snapshot-length glance, Clark estimates that the resolution of the human eye is around 5 to 15 megapixels (a range which includes both 4K and 8K), due to certain flaws of the human eye.

There are plans from different groups to start implementing 32K technology. While there are a few cameras that can shoot in 32K resolution, even 8K still does not have as widespread usage as 1080p and 4K do. There are less than 3% of televisions supporting 8K (with only some 9th generation gaming consoles supporting it), and none using 16K.

Two primary limiting factors in 32K are display resolution and CPU/GPU capability.

== History ==
=== Development ===
In 2018, Sony installed a 16K screen into the front of a cosmetics store in Yokohama, south of Tokyo. The 63 ft (19 m) widescreen display is believed to be the largest 16K screen yet. Sony has plans to make the product available, in custom sizes, for wealthy consumers. They are also currently working on developing a 32K display.

Currently, it is possible to run 32K resolutions using multi-monitor setups with AMD Eyefinity or Nvidia Surround using 16 8K TVs or monitors. No displays or monitors singly capable of displaying a 32K resolution are available to the consumer market yet.

=== Technology ===
==== Cameras in development ====
- The Linea HS 32K

==== Cameras ====
- Teledyne DALSA 32K Super Resolution CLHS Camera

== Editing ==
Currently, only Blackmagic Design's DaVinci Resolve 17 and newer versions support editing at 32K resolution.

== See also ==
- 4K resolution – digital video formats with a horizontal resolution of around 4,000 pixels
- 5K resolution – digital video formats with a horizontal resolution of around 5,000 pixels, aimed at non-television computer monitor usage
- 6K resolution – digital video formats with a horizontal resolution of around 6,000 pixels, aimed at non-television computer monitor usage
- 8K resolution – digital video formats with a horizontal resolution of around 8,000 pixels
- 10K resolution – digital video formats with a horizontal resolution of around 10,000 pixels, aimed at non-television computer monitor usage
- 16K resolution – digital video formats with a horizontal resolution of around 16,000 pixels
- Ultra-high-definition television (UHDTV) – digital video formats with resolutions of 4K (3840 × 2160) and 8K (7680 × 4320)
- Rec. 2020 – ITU-R Recommendation for UHDTV
- Digital movie camera
- Digital cinematography – makes extensive use of UHD video
- List of large sensor interchangeable-lens video cameras
