= 5K resolution =

Video or display resolutions with a width of around 5,000 pixels

Resolution comparison chart for 16:9 aspect ratio

Comparison of common display resolutions

5K resolution refers to display formats with a horizontal resolution of around 5,000 pixels. The most common 5K resolution is 5120 × 2880, which has an aspect ratio of 16∶9 with around 14.7 million pixels (just over seven times as many pixels as 1080p Full HD), with exactly twice the linear resolution of 1440p and four times that of 720p. This resolution is typically used in computer monitors to achieve a higher pixel density, and is not a standard format in digital television and digital cinematography, which feature 4K resolutions and 8K resolutions.

In comparison to 4K UHD (3840 × 2160), the 16∶9 5K resolution of 5120 × 2880 offers 1280 extra columns and 720 extra lines of display area, an increase of 33.3̅% in each dimension. This additional display area can allow 4K content to be displayed at native resolution without filling the entire screen, which means that additional software such as video editing suite toolbars will be available without having to downscale the content previews.

As of 2016, the world uses 1080p as the mainstream HD standard. However, there is a rapid increase in media content being released in 4K and even 5K resolution. Online streaming services such as Netflix and Amazon Prime Video launched videos in 4K resolution in 2014 and are actively expanding their collection of videos in 4K resolution. As 4K content becomes more common, the usefulness of 5K displays in editing and content creation may lead to a higher demand in the future.

== History ==
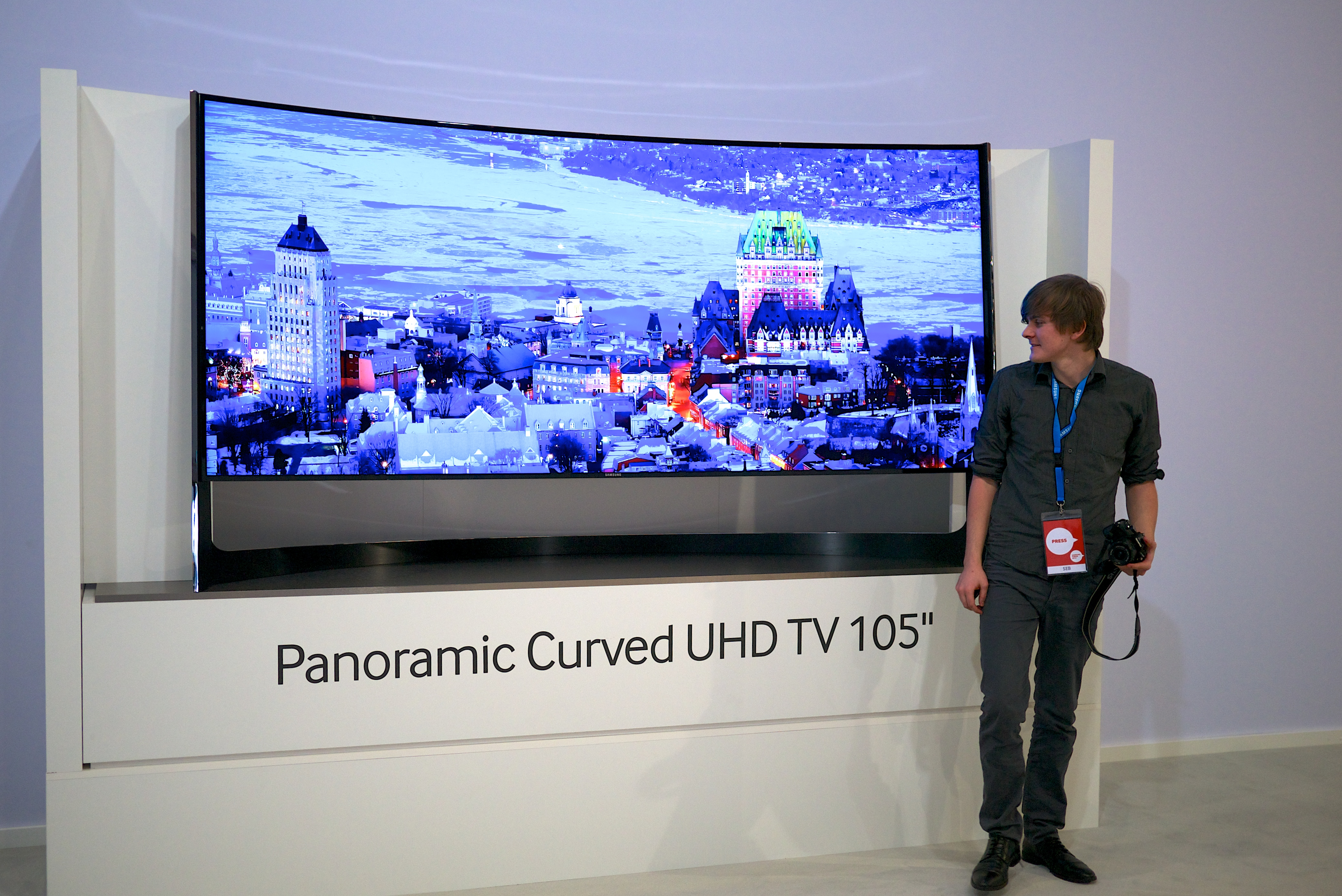
Samsung 105 inch Ultra HD television

=== First camera with 5K video capture ===
On April 14, 2008, Red Digital Cinema launched one of the first cameras capable of video capture at 5K resolutions. Red Epic uses the Mysterium X sensor which has a resolution of 5120 × 2700 and can capture at a framerate of up to 100 fps. Cameras with 5K resolution are used occasionally for recording films in digital cinematography.

Some photographic still cameras such as DSLRs can exceed 5K resolution when capturing still images, but not when capturing video. For example, the Canon EOS 5D Mark IV announced in August 2016 has a maximum resolution of 6720 × 4480 pixels (around 30 megapixels in a 3∶2 aspect ratio) which is used for high-resolution still images, but it can only capture video at a maximum of 4096 × 2160 and a framerate of 30 Hz.

=== First TV with 5K resolution ===
Samsung first demonstrated its 105-inch UN105S9W curved OLED TV at CES 2014. While Samsung lists the UN105S9W as a 4K UHD TV, it actually has native resolution of 5120 × 2160 (a 64∶27 or ≈21∶9 aspect ratio) which classifies it as a 5K display due to the horizontal pixel count of ≈5,000.

=== First commercially available large 5K resolution enterprise display line ===
Jupiter Systems in California was first to launch a full line of 5K resolution 21:9 large LCDs named Pana for the enterprise market in 2020, with engineering development that traced back to 2018. They were touch and non-touch models, with screen sizes 105" and 81", as well as a 34" desktop. In 2021, Jupiter continued with its exclusive 21:9 product offering by launching an ultra fine pitch direct view MicroLED product line, starting with 0.7mm pitch at 165" through 1.2mm pitch at 281", all in 5K 21:9 configurations.

=== First monitor with 5K resolution ===
On September 5, 2014, Dell unveiled the first monitor with a 5K resolution, the UltraSharp UP2715K. This monitor featured a 27-inch 5120 × 2880 display, giving it a pixel density of around 218 px/in. The monitor only supported DisplayPort version 1.2, which is limited to 5120 × 2880 at 30 Hz. To work around this, the UP2715K implemented a system by which the bandwidth of two DisplayPort connections could be combined to achieve 60 Hz, using a picture-by-picture mode to virtually treat the display as two smaller 2560 × 2880 monitors side-by-side and driving each half with a separate DisplayPort connection.

=== First monitor with 5K2K resolution ===
LG unveiled the 34WK95U at CES in January 2018, releasing it later that year. The monitor featured a 34-inch 5120 × 2160 Nano IPS display in a 21:9 aspect ratio, giving it a pixel density of around 163 px/in, and ran at 60 Hz. The latter carrying video and up to 85 W of power over a single cable.

LG introduced the first 5K2K monitors using OLED panels with the UltraGear 45GX950A, announced at CES in January 2025, a 45-inch curved model. In 2026 the 39-inch UltraGear evo 39GX950B followed at the same resolution.Both run at 165 Hz at 5120 × 2160 and switch to a reduced resolution at 330 Hz.

== Examples of 5K resolutions ==
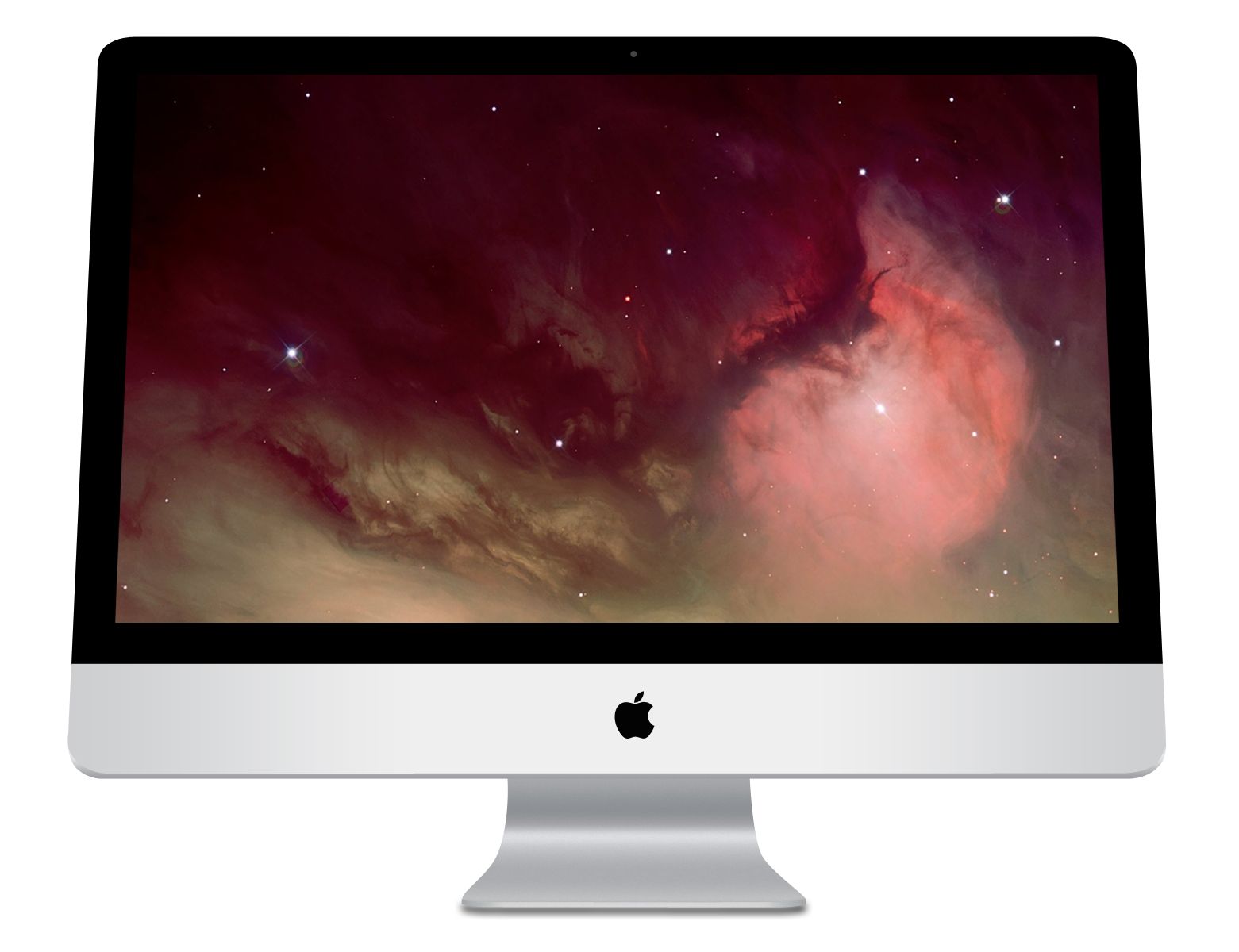
27" Retina 5K iMac (2014)

Resolution	Aspect ratio		Total pixels (Mpx)	Comments
5120 × 1440	3.5̅	32∶9	7.37	Equivalent to two QHD (2560 × 1440) images side-by-side
5120 × 2160	2.3̅7̅0̅	64∶27 (21 1/3∶9)	11.06	Equivalent to 4K UHD (3840 × 2160) extended in width by 33%; double the size of 2560 × 1080 in each dimension
5120 × 2560	2.0	2∶1 (18∶9)	13.11	
4800 × 2700	1.7̅	16∶9	12.96	Five times the size of 960 × 540 in each dimension
5120 × 2700	1.89̅6̅2̅	256∶135 (≈17∶9)	13.82	Same aspect ratio as the DCI 2K (2048 × 1080) and DCI 4K (4096 × 2160) formats
5120 × 2880	1.7̅	16∶9	14.75	Double the size of QHD (2560 × 1440) in each dimension
5120 × 3200	1.6	8∶5 (16∶10)	16.38	Double the size of 2560 × 1600 in each dimension
5120 × 3840	1.3̅	4∶3	19.66	Five times the size of 1024 × 768 in each dimension
5120 × 4096	1.25	5∶4	20.97	

The 24-inch 2021 iMac has a 16∶9 resolution of 4480 × 2520, which is considered neither 4K or 5K but 4.5K.

== List of devices with 5K resolution ==
=== Monitors ===
Aspect ratio	Device	Size (in)	Dimensions (mm)	Dimensions (inches)	Resolution	Total pixels (Mpx)	Pixel density (ppi)	Interface used for 5K	Comments
16:9	Dell UltraSharp UP2715K	27	596.74 × 335.66 (684.67 diagonal)	23.49 × 13.22 (26.95 diagonal)	5120 × 2880	14.75	218	Dual DisplayPort 1.2	First 5K monitor released
16:9	Apple Retina 5K iMac	27	596.74 × 335.66 (684.67 diagonal)	23.49 × 13.22 (26.95 diagonal)	5120 × 2880	14.75	218	Custom internal 8-lane DP 1.2 interface	First desktop with integrated 5K monitor released
16:9	HP Z27q	27	596.74 × 335.66 (684.67 diagonal)	23.49 × 13.22 (26.95 diagonal)	5120 × 2880	14.75	218	Dual DisplayPort 1.2	Model J3G14A4
16:9	Philips Brilliance 275P4VYKEB	27	596.74 × 335.66 (684.67 diagonal)	23.49 × 13.22 (26.95 diagonal)	5120 × 2880	14.75	218	Dual DisplayPort 1.2	
16:9	Planar IX2790	27	596.74 × 335.66 (684.67 diagonal)	23.49 × 13.22 (26.95 diagonal)	5120 × 2880	14.75	218	DisplayPort 1.4	
16:9	iiyama ProLite XB2779QQS	27	596.74 × 335.66 (684.67 diagonal)	23.49 × 13.22 (26.95 diagonal)	5120 × 2880	14.75	218	DisplayPort 1.4	
16:9	LG UltraFine 5K Display	27	596.74 × 335.66 (684.67 diagonal)	23.49 × 13.22 (26.95 diagonal)	5120 × 2880	14.75	218	Thunderbolt 3	First 5K Thunderbolt 3 connected monitor released, aimed at Mac users, using a custom dual-DP 1.2 controller
16:9	Apple Studio Display	27	596.74 × 335.66 (684.67 diagonal)	23.49 × 13.22 (26.95 diagonal)	5120 × 2880	14.75	218	Thunderbolt 3	Aimed at Mac users, though basic functionality works on other operating systems
16:9	Asus ROG Strix XG27JCG	27	596.74 × 335.66 (684.67 diagonal)	23.49 × 13.22 (26.95 diagonal)	5120 × 2880	14.75	218	DisplayPort 1.4, HDMI 2.1	High-refresh rate dual-mode gaming monitor released in 2026; supports up to 180 Hz @ 5K via DSC, or 330 Hz @ 1440p
16:9	LG UltraGear evo GM9 27GM950B	27	596.74 × 335.66 (684.67 diagonal)	23.49 × 13.22 (26.95 diagonal)	5120 × 2880	14.75	218	DisplayPort 2.1, HDMI 2.1	High-refresh rate dual-mode gaming monitor released in 2026; supports up to 165 Hz @ 5K, or 330 Hz @ 1440p
16:9	MSI MPG 271KRAW18	27	596.74 × 335.66 (684.67 diagonal)	23.49 × 13.22 (26.95 diagonal)	5120 × 2880	14.75	218	DisplayPort 2.1, HDMI 2.1	Announced high-refresh rate dual-mode gaming monitor; supports up to 180 Hz @ 5K, or 330 Hz @ 1440p
16:9	Gigabyte Aorus FM275K16P	27	596.74 × 335.66 (684.67 diagonal)	23.49 × 13.22 (26.95 diagonal)	5120 × 2880	14.75	218	DisplayPort 2.1, HDMI 2.1	High-refresh rate triple-mode gaming monitor scheduled for release in Q4 2026; supports up to 180 Hz @ 5K, 220 Hz at 4K, or 330 Hz @ 1440p
16:9	AOC Agon Pro AGP277KX	27	596.74 × 335.66 (684.67 diagonal)	23.49 × 13.22 (26.95 diagonal)	5120 × 2880	14.75	218	DisplayPort 2.1, HDMI 2.1	High-refresh rate dual-mode gaming monitor released in 2026; supports up to 180 Hz @ 5K, or 350 Hz @ 1440p
16:9	HKC M9 Pro	27	596.74 × 335.66 (684.67 diagonal)	23.49 × 13.22 (26.95 diagonal)	5120 × 2880	14.75	218	TBA	Supports up to 5K @ 180 Hz
16:9	Hisense GX Ultra	27	596.74 × 335.66 (684.67 diagonal)	23.49 × 13.22 (26.95 diagonal)	5120 × 2880	14.75	218	TBA	Supports up to 180 Hz @ 5K, or 330 Hz @ 1440p
64:27 (≈21:9)	LG 34WK95U	34	793.77 × 340.19 (863.6 diagonal)	31.25 × 13.39 (33 diagonal)	5120 × 2160	11.06	163	Thunderbolt 3 / USB-C, DisplayPort 1.4	First 5120 × 2160 monitor
64:27 (≈21:9)	Philips 349P9H	34	793.77 × 340.19 (863.6 diagonal)	31.25 × 13.39 (33 diagonal)	5120 × 2160	11.06	163	USB-C	
64:27 (≈21:9)	MSI Prestige PS341WU	34	793.77 × 340.19 (863.6 diagonal)	31.25 × 13.39 (33 diagonal)	5120 × 2160	11.06	163	USB-C, DisplayPort 1.4	
64:27 (≈21:9)	Dell U4025QW	40	929.28 x 392.04 (1008.59 diagonal)	36.59 x 15.43 (39.7 diagonal)	5120 × 2160		140	HDMI 2.1, DisplayPort 1.4, USB-C, Thunderbolt 4	
64:27 (≈21:9)	Lenovo P40w-20	40	929.3 x 392 (1008.6 diagonal)	(39.7 diagonal)	5120 × 2160		140	HDMI 2.0, DisplayPort 1.4, USB-C, Thunderbolt 4	
32:9	Philips Brilliance 499P9H	49	1,198.08 × 336.96 (1,244.6 diagonal)	47.17 × 13.27 (49 diagonal)	5120 × 1440	7.37	109	HDMI 2.0, DisplayPort 1.4, USB-C	First 5120 × 1440 monitor
32:9	Philips Evnia 49M2C8900L/00	49	1,198.08 × 336.96 (1,244.6 diagonal)	47.17 × 13.27 (49 diagonal)	5120 × 1440	7.37	109	HDMI 2.0, DisplayPort 1.4, USB-C	QD OLED, DisplayPort: 144 Hz, HDMI: 60 Hz
32:9	Dell Ultrasharp U4919DW	49	1,198.08 × 336.96 (1,244.6 diagonal)	47.17 × 13.27 (49 diagonal)	5120 × 1440	7.37	109	DisplayPort 1.4, Thunderbolt 3	
32:9	LG 49WL95	49	1,198.08 × 336.96 (1,244.6 diagonal)	47.17 × 13.27 (49 diagonal)	5120 × 1440	7.37	109	HDMI 2.0, DisplayPort 1.4, USB-C	
32:9	Samsung CRG9	49	1,198.08 × 336.96 (1,244.6 diagonal)	47.17 × 13.27 (49 diagonal)	5120 × 1440	7.37	109	DisplayPort 1.4	
AOC AG493UCX	HDMI 2.0 x 2, DisplayPort 1.4 x 2, USB-C 3.0 Gen 1								

=== Televisions ===
Aspect ratio	Device	Size (in)	Resolution	Total pixels (Mpx)	Pixel density (ppi)	Comments
64:27 (≈21:9)	LG 105UC9	105	5120 × 2160	11.06	53	
64:27 (≈21:9)	Samsung UN105S9W	105	5120 × 2160	11.06	53	

== Display interface and graphics card support ==
In order to fully utilize a display with a 5K resolution, the source and display both require support for advanced connection interfaces, since traditional interfaces such as VGA or DVI don't provide adequate bandwidth for 5K resolutions at acceptable framerates. The earliest interface to support 5120 × 2880 at 30 Hz or above was DisplayPort, using the HBR2 transmission speed introduced in version 1.2. This could support 5120 × 2880 at 30 Hz with 30 bit/px color depth. HBR2 was first implemented in AMD's Radeon HD 6850 and 6870 in October 2010. Nvidia introduced HBR2 support on their products with the Kepler family of GPUs, starting with the GeForce GTX 680 in March 2012.

HDMI gained similar capability in version 2.0, which increased the maximum allowed transmission speed to 600 MHz TMDS (18 Gbit/s). The Nvidia GeForce GTX 980, launched in late 2014, was the first graphics card to implement this capability, which was sufficient for 5120 × 2880 at 30 Hz with 30 bit/px color depth.

The Nvidia GeForce GTX 1080 launched in mid 2016 and was the first graphics card to introduce support for the HBR3 transmission speed defined in version 1.3 of the DisplayPort standard, allowing it to support 5120 × 2880 at 60 Hz with 24 bit/px color depth. It was followed shortly by the AMD Radeon RX 480, which introduced support for HBR3 and 600 MHz HDMI transmission on the AMD side.

Although 5K 60 Hz over a single cable was only made possible in 2016 with the launch of the GeForce 1000 series and Radeon RX 400 series, monitors which predate version 1.3 of the DisplayPort standard such as the Dell UltraSharp UP2715K offer the ability to run at 5K 60 Hz by using two HBR2 DisplayPort connections concurrently in a specialized picture-by-picture mode. The Apple Retina 5K iMac released in 2014 used a custom internal interface with 8 lanes of DisplayPort at HBR2 speed (a standard DP connection is 4 lanes) to drive its display panel at 60 Hz.

Rendering at 5K also demands considerably more graphics performance than lower resolutions. One technique for displaying lower-resolution content on such monitors without corresponding graphics hardware is on-device upscaling. Introduced by LG in 2026 on its UltraGear evo GM9 and GX9 gaming monitors, it uses a built-in processor to reconstruct the input signal toward the panel's native resolution, allowing a computer to render at a reduced resolution for higher frame rates than native 5K rendering would permit.

Display mode			Maximum refresh frequency (Hz)				
Resolution	Ratio	Color depth	HDMI 2.0	HDMI 2.1	DP 1.2	DP 1.3–1.4	DP 2.0
5120 × 2160	(≈21∶9)	8 bpc (24 bit/px)	50	144	60	85	240
5120 × 2160	(≈21∶9)	10 bpc (30 bit/px)	30	100	30	60	200
5120 × 2880	(16∶9)	8 bpc (24 bit/px)	30	100	30	60	200
5120 × 2880	(16∶9)	10 bpc (30 bit/px)	30	85	30	50	144
Only the highest standard frequencies (24 / 30 / 50 / 60 / 75 / 85 / 100 / 120 / 144 / 200 / 240) are listed. CVT-RB timing format and uncompressed RGB or YC_{B}C_{R} 4:4:4 color mode are assumed.

== See also ==
- 1080p Full HD – digital video format with a horizontal resolution of 1920×1080
- 1440p – digital video format with a vertical resolution of 1440, aimed at non-television computer monitor usage
- 21:9 aspect ratio – a common widescreen cinema aspect ratio
- 4K resolution – digital video formats with a horizontal resolution of around 4,000 pixels
- 6K resolution – digital video formats with a horizontal resolution of around 6,000 pixels
- 8K resolution – digital video formats with a horizontal resolution of around 8,000 pixels
- 10K resolution – digital video formats with a horizontal resolution of around 10,000 pixels, aimed at non-television computer monitor usage
- 16K resolution – experimental VR format
- Aspect ratio (image) – proportional relationship between an image's width and height
- Display resolution
