= 4K resolution =

Video or display resolutions with a width of around 4,000 pixels

Comparison of common broadcast resolutions

4K resolution is a generic term to refer to any horizontal display resolution of approximately 4,000 pixels. Several different 4K resolutions have been standardized by various organizations, including 4096 × 2160 for digital cinematography, and 3840 × 2160 for digital television.

The terms 4K and Ultra HD are used more widely in marketing than 2160p (cf. 1080p), and typically refer to motion pictures and video. Some digital camera vendors have used the term 4K photo for still photographs, making it appear like an especially high resolution even though 3840 × 2160 pixels equal approximately 8.3 megapixels, which is not considered to be especially high for still photographs. 4K resolution is approximately 8 million pixels, which is 4 times as many as 1080p. 4K television market share increased as prices fell dramatically throughout 2013 and 2014.

== Standards ==
=== DCI Digital Cinema System Specification ===
Comparison of DCI and UHD resolutions

In 2005, Digital Cinema Initiatives (DCI), a prominent standards organization in the cinema industry, published the Digital Cinema System Specification. This specification establishes standardized 2K and 4K container formats for digital cinema production, with resolutions of 2048 × 1080 and 4096 × 2160 respectively. The resolution of the video content inside follows the SMPTE ST 429 standard, which establishes the following resolutions for a 4K distribution:

- 4096 × 2160 (full frame, 256∶135 or ≈1.90∶1 aspect ratio)
- 3996 × 2160 (flat crop, 1.85∶1 aspect ratio)
- 4096 × 1716 (CinemaScope crop, ≈2.39∶1 aspect ratio)

2K distributions can have a frame rate of either 24 or 48 FPS, while 4K distributions must have a frame rate of 24 FPS.

Some articles claim that the terms 2K and 4K were coined by DCI and refer exclusively to the 2K and 4K formats defined in the DCI standard. However, usage of these terms in the cinema industry predates the publication of the DCI standard, and they are generally understood as casual terms for any resolution approximately 2000 or 4000 pixels in width, rather than names for specific standard resolutions.

=== SMPTE UHDTV standard ===
In 2007, the Society of Motion Picture and Television Engineers published SMPTE ST 2036-1, which defines parameters for two UHDTV systems called UHDTV1 and UHDTV2. The standard defines the following characteristics for these systems:

- A resolution of 3840 × 2160 (UHDTV1) or 7680 × 4320 (UHDTV2)
- Square (1∶1) pixels, for an overall image aspect ratio of 16∶9
- A framerate of 23.976, 24, 25, 29.97, 30, 50, 59.94, 60, 100, 119.88, or 120 Hz with progressive scan
- RGB, Y′C_{B}C_{R} 4:4:4, 4:2:2, or 4:2:0 pixel encoding
- 10 bpc (30 bit/px) or 12 bpc (36 bit/px) color depth
- Colorimetry characteristics as defined in the standard, including color primaries, quantization parameters, and the electro-optical transfer function. These are the same characteristics later standardized in ITU-R BT.2020. UHDTV1 systems are permitted to use BT.709 color primaries up to 60 Hz.

=== ITU-R UHDTV standard ===
In 2012, the International Telecommunication Union, Radiocommunication Sector published Recommendation BT.2020, also known as the Ultra High Definition Television (UHDTV) standard. It adopts the same image parameters defined in SMPTE ST 2036–1.

Although the UHDTV standard does not define any official names for the formats it defines, ITU typically uses the terms 4K, 4K UHD, or 4K UHDTV to refer to the 3840 × 2160 system in public announcements and press releases (8K for the 7680 × 4320 system). In some of ITU's other standards documents, the terms UHDTV1 and UHDTV2 are used as shorthand.

=== CEA Ultra HD ===
In October 2012, the Consumer Electronics Association (CEA) announced its definition of the term Ultra High-Definition (or Ultra HD) for use with marketing consumer display devices. CEA defines an Ultra HD product as a TV, monitor, or projector with the following characteristics:

- A resolution of 3840 × 2160 or larger
- An aspect ratio of 1.7̅7̅∶1 (16∶9) or wider
- Support for color depth of 8 bpc (24 bit/px) or higher
- At least one HDMI input capable of supporting 3840 × 2160 at 24, 30, and 60 Hz progressive scan (though not necessarily with RGB or Y′C_{B}C_{R} 4:4:4 color), and HDCP 2.2
- Capable of processing images according to the color space defined in ITU-R BT.709
- Capable of upscaling HD content (i.e., 720p or 1080p)

The CEA definition does allow manufacturers to use other terms—such as 4K—alongside the Ultra HD logo. Since the resolution in CEA's definition is only a minimum requirement, displays with higher resolutions such as 4096 × 2160 or 5120 × 2880 also qualify as Ultra HD displays, provided they meet the other requirements.

=== 2160p resolution ===
Some 4K resolutions, like 3840 × 2160, are often casually referred to as 2160p. This name follows from the previous naming convention used by HDTV and SDTV formats, which refer to a format by the number of pixels or lines along the vertical axis (such as 1080p for 1920 × 1080 progressive scan, or 480i for the 480-line interlaced SDTV formats) rather than the horizontal pixel count (≈4000 or 4K for 3840 × 2160).

The term 2160p could be applied to any format with a height of 2160 pixels, but it is most commonly used in reference to the 4K UHDTV resolution of 3840 × 2160 due to its association with the well-known 720p and 1080p HDTV formats. Although 3840 × 2160 is both a 4K resolution and a 2160p resolution, these terms cannot always be used interchangeably since not all 4K resolutions are 2160 pixels tall, and not all 2160p resolutions are ≈4000 pixels wide. However, some companies have begun using the term 4K to describe devices with support for a 2160p resolution, even if it is not close to 4000 pixels wide. For example, many 4K dash cams only support a resolution of 2880 × 2160 (4∶3); although this is a 2160p resolution, it is not a 4K resolution. Conversely, Samsung released a 5120 × 2160 (64∶27) TV, but marketed it as a 4K TV despite its 5K-class resolution.

==== M+ or RGBW TV controversy ====
In 2015, LG Display announced the implementation of a new technology called M+, which is the addition of white subpixels along with the regular RGB dots in their IPS panel technology. The media and internet users later called these RGBW TVs because of the white sub pixel.

Most of the new M+ technology was employed on 4K TV sets, which led to a controversy after tests showed that the addition of a white subpixel replacing the traditional RGB structure would reduce the resolution by around 25%. After tests done by Intertek in which the technical aspects of LG M+ TVs were analyzed and they concluded that "the addressable resolution display is 2880 × 2160 for each red, green, blue", in other words, the LG TVs were technically 2.8K as it became known in the controversy. The 4K M+ displays are incapable of achieving true 4K UHD resolution as defined by the CTA as 3840 × 2160 active pixels with 8-bit per color. This negatively impacts the rendering of text, making it a bit fuzzier, which is especially noticeable when a TV is used as a PC monitor. Although LG developed this technology for use in notebook displays, outdoor displays, and smartphones, it is more popular in the TV market due to the marketed 4K UHD resolution.

=== CinemaWide 4K ===
In 2019, Sony was granted the CinemaWide trademark by the European Union Intellectual Property Office (EUIPO), in which the trademark covers 'Class 9' electronic devices, including smartphones. According to Sony and SID, the standard defines a CinemaWide 4K product with the following characteristics:

- A resolution of 3840 × 1644 or larger
- An aspect ratio of 21∶9
- Capable of playing back 4K resolution video (2160p) in an aspect ratio of 21∶9
- Capable of upscaling non-4K content (i.e. 720p / 1080p)

Sony Xperia smartphones are the most widely known products that equipped with CinemaWide 4K display, such as Xperia 1, Xperia 1 II, Xperia 1 III, Xperia 1 IV and Xperia 1 V.

== Adoption ==
Video sharing website YouTube and the television industry have adopted 3840 × 2160 as their 4K standard. As of 2014, 4K content from major broadcasters remained limited. By late 2014, 4K content was becoming more widely available online, including on Apple TV, YouTube, Netflix, Hulu, and Amazon Prime Video.

By 2013, some UHDTV models were available to general consumers in the range of US$600. As of 2015, prices on smaller computer and television panels had dropped below US$400.

=== ATSC ===
On March 26, 2013, the Advanced Television Systems Committee announced new proposals of a new standard called ATSC 3.0 which would implement UHD broadcasts at resolutions of up to 3840 × 2160 or 7680 × 4320. The standard would also include framerates of up to 120 Hz, HEVC encoding, wide color gamut, as well as high dynamic range.

=== DVB ===
In 2014, the Digital Video Broadcasting Project released a new set of standards intended to guide the implementation of high-resolution content in broadcast television. Dubbed DVB-UHDTV, it establishes two standards, known as UHD-1 (for 4K content) and UHD-2 (for 8K content). These standards use resolutions of 3840 × 2160 and 7680 × 4320 respectively, with framerates of up to 60 Hz, color depth up to 10 bpc (30 bit/px), and HEVC encoding for transmission. DVB is currently focusing on the implementation of the UHD-1 standard.

DVB finalized UHD-1 Phase 2 in 2016, with the introduction of service by broadcasters expected in 2017. UHD-1 Phase 2 adds features such as high dynamic range (using HLG and PQ at 10 or 12 bits), wide color gamut (BT. 2020/2100 colorimetry), and high frame rate (up to 120 Hz).

=== Video streaming ===
As of February 2025, both YouTube and Vimeo support high-resolution video uploads, with maximum resolutions of 4096 × 2304 pixels (approximately 9.4 megapixels) and 4096 × 2160 pixels (approximately 8.8 megapixels), respectively. The growing availability of 4K content across streaming platforms like Netflix, Amazon Prime Video, and YouTube has made it more accessible to consumers. Vimeo's 4K content is currently limited to mostly nature documentaries and tech coverage.

High Efficiency Video Coding (HEVC or H.265) facilitates streaming of 4K content at bitrates between 20 and 30 Mbit/s, offering efficient compression without significant quality loss.

In January 2014, Naughty America launched the first adult video service streaming in 4K.

In February 2025, Super Bowl LIX was broadcast in 4K resolution with Dolby Vision HDR and Dolby Atmos sound for the first time. Fox aired the game, and it was also available for free streaming in 4K on Tubi, marking a significant milestone in sports broadcasting.

=== Mobile phone cameras ===
The first mobile phones to be able to record at 2160p (3840 × 2160) were released in late 2013, including the Samsung Galaxy Note 3, which is able to record 2160p at 30 frames per second.

In the year 2014, the OnePlus One was released with the option to record DCI 4K (4096 × 2160) at 24 frames per second, as well as LG G3 and Samsung Galaxy Note 4 with optical image stabilization.

In the year 2015, Apple announced the iPhone 6s was released with the 12 megapixel camera that has the option to record 4K at 25 or 30 frames per second.

In the years 2017 and 2018, mobile phone chipsets reached sufficient processing power that mobile phone vendors started releasing mobile phones that allow recording 2160p footage at 60 frames per second for a smoother and more realistic appearance.

=== Personal computers ===
iMac with Retina Display (2014) is one of the earliest computers that utilise 4K widescreen.

== History ==
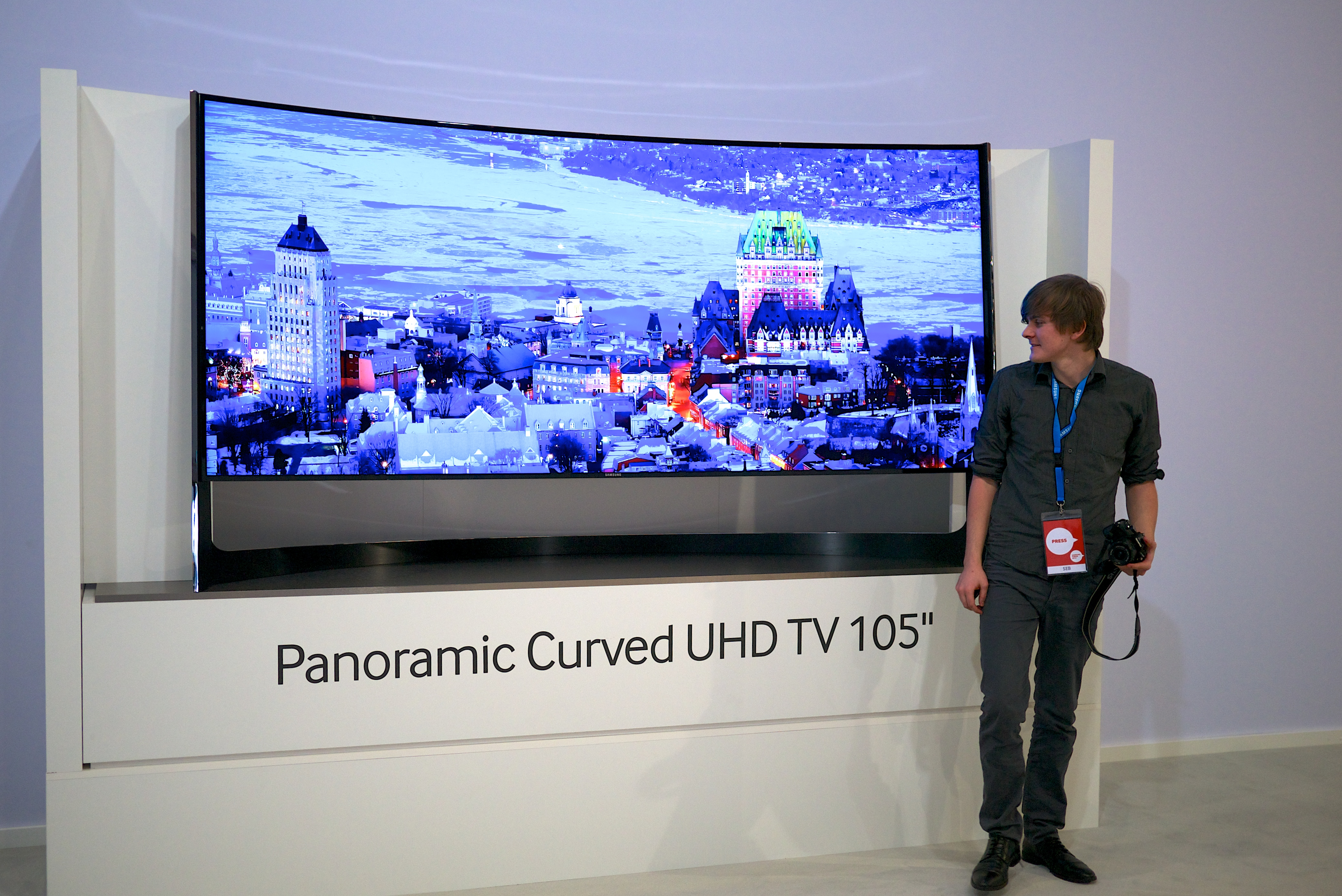
Samsung UN105S9 105-inch (2,700 mm) ultra-high-definition 4K television

In 1981, the NEC μPD7220 computer graphics processor supported monochrome resolutions up to 4096×1024p (progressive scan) or 4096×2048i (interlaced). In 1984, Hitachi's ACRTC HD63484 graphics processor supported monochrome resolutions up to 4096×2048p (progressive scan) or 4096×4096i (interlaced), targeted at the bit-mapped desktop publishing market.

In 2000, JVC introduced the first 4K digital cinema video projector using D-ILA technology. The first commercially available 4K camera for cinematographic purposes was the Dalsa Origin, released in 2003. Sony began offering 4K digital cinema projectors in 2004. 4K digital projectors were introduced to movie theaters in 2005, but most theaters continued using analog movie projectors until 4K digital projectors eventually replaced them by 2011.

4K streaming technology was developed during the mid-to-late 2000s by several research groups in universities around the world, such as University of California, San Diego, CALIT2, Keio University and Naval Postgraduate School. They realized several demonstrations in venues such as IGrid in 2004 and CineGrid.

YouTube began supporting 4K for video uploads in 2010 as a result of leading manufacturers producing 4K cameras. Users could view 4K video by selecting "Original" from the quality settings until December 2013, when the 2160p option appeared in the quality menu. In November 2013, YouTube began to use the VP9 video compression standard, saying that it was more suitable for 4K than High Efficiency Video Coding (HEVC). Google, which owns YouTube, developed VP9.

The first commercially released 4K television set was the Toshiba Regza 55X3 in December 2011 in Japan, at launch costing over $11,000. Both LG and Sony Bravia had also introduced 4K resolution TVs by the latter half of 2012.

The first 4K home theater projector was released by Sony in 2012. Despite this, as of 2023, there are not many finished films with 4K resolution. Even for movies and TV shows shot using 6K or 8K cameras, almost all finished films are edited in HD resolution and enlarged to fit a 4K format.

Sony is one of the leading studios promoting UHDTV content, as of 2013 offering a little over 70 movie and television titles via digital download to a specialized player that stores and decodes the video. The large files (≈40 GB), distributed through consumer broadband connections, raise concerns about data caps.

In 2014, Netflix began streaming House of Cards, Breaking Bad, and "some nature documentaries" at 4K to compatible televisions with an HEVC decoder. Most 4K televisions sold in 2013 did not natively support HEVC, with most major manufacturers announcing support in 2014. Amazon Studios began shooting their full-length original series and new pilots with 4K resolution in 2014. They are now currently available through Amazon Video.

In March 2016 the first players and discs for Ultra HD Blu-ray—a physical optical disc format supporting 4K resolution and high-dynamic-range video (HDR) at 60 frames per second—were released.

On August 2, 2016, Microsoft released the Xbox One S, which supports 4K streaming and has an Ultra HD Blu-ray disc drive, but does not support 4K gaming. On November 10, 2016, Sony released the PlayStation 4 Pro, which supports 4K streaming and gaming, though many games use checkerboard rendering or are upscaled 4K. On November 7, 2017, Microsoft released the Xbox One X, which supports 4K streaming and gaming, though not all games are rendered at native 4K.

=== Home video projection ===
Though the price of home cinema viewing devices began to drop rapidly from 2013, the digital video projector market saw limited expansion as very few manufacturers had fully 4K-capable lineups. Native 4K projectors remained priced in the five-figure range well into 2015, only falling below US$10,000 later that year. Sony was the sole major manufacturer offering a comprehensive 4K projection solution as of 2015. Critics argue that, at typical direct-view panel sizes and viewing distances, the extra pixels of 4K are unnecessary for normal human vision. In contrast, home cinema projectors use larger screens without necessarily increasing the viewing distance to match the scale. One technique to provide a more affordable 4K experience in home cinema projectors is "e-shift." Developed by some manufacturers, e-shift extrapolates additional pixels from 1080p sources to either upscale to 4K or display 4K from native 4K sources at a much lower price point than native 4K projectors. This technology reached its fourth generation in 2016. JVC applied this technology to create an 8K flight simulation system for Boeing, meeting the visual acuity limits of 20/25.

The first pixel-shifted 4K UHD projectors adopted by the market are Optoma, BenQ, Dell, et al., for those adopt a 2718×1528 pixel structure. The amount of data these projectors process is true 4K, but they overlap the pixels, which is what pixel shifting is. In fact, each of those pixels is far larger. In fact, each one has 50% more area than true 4K. Pixel shifting projectors. This way, they project a pixel and shift it up to the right by a half diameter and project it again with modified data—the second pixel overlaid on the first. This would result in adjacent red and green pixels effectively forming yellow, with a fringe on one side of red, on the other of green—except that the fringe takes on another color as the next line of pixels overlaps too. 4K UHD or 1080p pixel shifting cannot reveal the fine detail of a true 4K projector such as those Sony ships in the business, education, and home markets. JVC has one true 4K at $35,000 (in mid-2017) and another for $120,000.

While projecting UHD, it might look as though the pixel structures would have 1/4 the area of 1080p; it just doesn't happen with pixel shifting. That much resolution is only carried by a true 4K projector. This is why "true" 4K costs so much more than 4K UHD projectors that have more or less similar feature sets. They produce smaller pixels, finer resolution—no loss of detail or color from the overlapping pixels. This is in stark contrast to the small variation in the aspect ratio difference, which would be capable of being noticeable in a few companies, such as Kaleidescape, offering media servers that enable 4K UHD Blu-ray movies with a wide dynamic range in a home theater.

== Broadcasting ==
In November 2014, American satellite provider DirecTV (owned by AT&T) became the first pay-TV provider to offer access to 4K content, although limited to selected video-on-demand films. In August 2015, British sports network BT Sport launched a 4K feed, with its first broadcast being the 2015 FA Community Shield football match. Two production units were used, producing the traditional broadcast in high-definition, and a separate 4K broadcast. As the network did not want to mix 4K footage with upconverted HD footage, this telecast did not feature traditional studio segments at pre-game or half-time, but those hosted from the stadium by the match commentators using a 4K camera. BT envisioned that if viewers wanted to watch studio analysis, they would switch to the HD broadcast and then back for the game. Footage was compressed using H.264 encoders and transmitted to BT Tower, where it was then transmitted back to BT Sport studios and decompressed for distribution, via 4K-compatible BT TV set-top boxes on an eligible BT Infinity internet plan with at least a 25 Mbit/s connection.

In late 2015 and January 2016, three of Canada's television providers – including Quebec-based Vidéotron, Ontario-based Rogers Cable, and Bell Fibe TV, announced that they would begin to offer 4K compatible set-top boxes that can stream 4K content to subscribers over gigabit internet service. On October 5, 2015, alongside the announcement of its 4K set-top box and gigabit internet, Canadian media conglomerate Rogers Communications announced that it planned to produce 101 sports telecasts in 4K in 2016 via its Sportsnet division, including all Toronto Blue Jays home games, and "marquee" National Hockey League games beginning in January 2016. Bell Media announced via its TSN division a slate of 4K telecasts to begin on January 20, 2016, including selected Toronto Raptors games and regional NHL games.

On January 14, 2016, in cooperation with BT Sport, Sportsnet broadcast the first ever NBA game produced in 4K – a Toronto Raptors/Orlando Magic game at O2 Arena in London, England. On January 20, also during a Raptors game, TSN presented the first live 4K telecast produced in North America. Three days later, Sportsnet presented the first NHL game in 4K.

Dome Productions, a joint venture of Bell Media and Rogers Media (the respective owners of TSN and Sportsnet), constructed a "side-by-side" 4K mobile production unit shared by Sportsnet and TSN's first 4K telecasts; it was designed to operate alongside a separate HD truck and utilize cameras capable of output in both formats. For the opening game of the 2016 Toronto Blue Jays season, Dome constructed "Trillium" – a production truck integrating both 4K and 1080i high-definition units. Bell Media's CTV also broadcast the 2016 Juno Awards in 4K as the first awards show presented in the format.

In February 2016, Spanish-language Univision trialed 4K by producing a closed-circuit TV broadcast of a football friendly between the national teams of Mexico and Senegal from Miami (America) in the format. The broadcast was streamed privately to several special viewing locations. Univision aimed to develop a 4K streaming app to publicly televise the final of Copa América Centenario in 4K. In March 2016, DirecTV and CBS Sports announced that they would produce the "Amen Corner" supplemental coverage from the Masters golf tournament in 4K.

In late 2016, Telus TV announced that they would begin to offer 4K compatible set-top boxes.

After having trialed the technology in limited matches at the 2013 FIFA Confederations Cup, and the 2014 FIFA World Cup (via private tests and public viewings in the host city of Rio de Janeiro), the 2018 FIFA World Cup was the first FIFA World Cup in which all matches were produced in 4K. Host Broadcasting Services stated that at least 75% of the broadcast cut on each match would come from 4K cameras (covering the majority of main angles), with instant replays and some camera angles being upconverted from 1080p sources. These broadcasts were made available from selected rightsholders, such as the BBC in the UK, and selected television providers in the United States.

Technical limitations in distributing 4K broadcasts (including the increased cost of 4K-compatible production equipment) have led to some broadcasters deciding against the format in favour of emphasizing 1080p/HDR broadcasts instead. After having broadcast UEFA Euro and the Champions League final in the format, UEFA discontinued 4K coverage for both in 2024, as broadcasters elected to put resources behind HDR and other on-air features instead. Some U.S. broadcasters, such as CBS Sports, Fox Sports, and USA Network have broadcast events promoted as having "4K" feeds, but are actually 1080p/HDR broadcasts upconverted to 4K. For the 2024 Summer Olympics, USA Network's "4K" coverage was sourced from host broadcaster Olympic Broadcasting Services (OBS) in 4K, but downconverted to 1080p when received by NBC Sports' studios, and then upconverted to 4K for distribution.

== Resolutions ==
Examples of some 4K resolutions used in displays and media
Format	Resolution	Aspect ratio		Pixels
Hex XGA (HXGA)	4096 × 3072	1.3̅3̅	4∶3	12,582,912
4K Plus Ultra HD (4K+UHD)	4096 × 2560	1.6	16∶10	10,485,760
Apple iMac Retina 4K	4096 × 2304	1.7̅7̅	16∶9	9,437,184
DCI 4K (full frame)	4096 × 2160	≈1.90	256∶135	8,847,360
-	4096 × 2048	2.0	2∶1	8,388,608
DCI 4K (CinemaScope cropped)	4096 × 1716	≈2.39	1024∶429	7,020,544
DCI 4K (flat cropped)	3996 × 2160	1.85	37∶20	8,631,360
4K Plus Ultra HD (4K+UHD)	3840 × 2560	1.5	3∶2	9,830,400
Wide Quad Ultra XGA (WQUXGA)	3840 × 2400	1.6	16∶10	9,216,000
4K Ultra HD (4K UHD)	3840 × 2160	1.7̅7̅	16∶9	8,294,400
-	3840 × 1920	2.0	2∶1	7,372,800
CinemaWide 4K	3840 × 1644	≈2.34	320∶137	6,312,960
-	3840 × 1620	≈2.37	128∶55	6,220,800
Ultra Wide Quad XGA (UWQXGA)	3840 × 1600	2.4	12∶5	6,144,000
Double Full HD (DFHD)	3840 × 1080	3.5̅5̅	32∶9	4,147,200

=== 3840 × 2160 ===
The resolution of 3840 × 2160 is the dominant 4K resolution in the consumer media and display industries. This is the resolution of the UHDTV1 format defined in SMPTE ST 2036–1, as well as the 4K UHDTV format defined by ITU-R in Rec. 2020, and is also the minimum resolution for CEA's definition of Ultra HD displays and projectors. The resolution of 3840 × 2160 was also chosen by the DVB project for their 4K broadcasting standard, UHD-1.

This resolution has an aspect ratio of 16∶9, with 8,294,400 total pixels. It is exactly double the horizontal and vertical resolution of 1080p (1920 × 1080) for a total of 4 times as many pixels, and triple the horizontal and vertical resolution of 720p (1280 × 720) for a total of 9 times as many pixels. It is sometimes referred to as "2160p", based on the naming patterns established by the previous 720p and 1080p HDTV standards.

In 2013, televisions capable of displaying UHD resolutions were seen by consumer electronics companies as the next trigger for an upgrade cycle after a lack of consumer interest in 3D television.

=== 4096 × 2160 ===
This resolution is used mainly in digital cinema production, and has a total of 8,847,360 pixels with an aspect ratio of 256∶135 (≈19∶10). It was standardized as the resolution of the 4K container format defined by Digital Cinema Initiatives in the Digital Cinema System specification, and is the native resolution of all DCI-compliant 4K digital projectors and monitors. The DCI specification allows several different resolutions for the content inside the container, depending on the desired aspect ratio. The allowed resolutions are defined in SMPTE 428-1:

- 4096 × 2160 (full frame, 256∶135 or ≈1.90∶1 aspect ratio)
- 3996 × 2160 (flat crop, 1.85∶1 aspect ratio)
- 4096 × 1716 (CinemaScope crop, ≈2.39∶1 aspect ratio)

The DCI 4K standard has twice the horizontal and vertical resolution of DCI 2K (2048 × 1080), with four times as many pixels overall.

Digital movies made in 4K may be produced, scanned, or stored in a number of other resolutions depending on what storage aspect ratio is used. In the digital cinema production chain, a resolution of 4096 × 3112 is often used for acquiring "open gate" or anamorphic input material, a resolution based on the historical resolution of scanned Super 35 mm film.

=== Other 4K resolutions ===
Various other non-standardized 4K resolutions have been used in displays, including:

- 4096 × 2560 (1.60:1 or 16:10); this resolution was used in the Canon DP-V3010, a 30-inch (76 cm) 4K reference monitor designed for reviewing cinema footage in post-production, released in 2013.
- 4096 × 2304 (1.7̅7̅:1 or 16:9); this resolution was used in the 21.5-inch (55 cm) LG UltraFine 22MD4KA 4K monitor, jointly announced by LG and Apple in 2016 and used in the 21.5" 4K Retina iMac computer.
- 3840 × 2400 (1.60:1 or 16:10); this resolution was used in the 22.2-inch (56 cm) IBM T220 and T221 monitors, released in 2001 and 2002 respectively. This resolution is also referred to as "WQUXGA", and is four times the resolution of WUXGA (1920 × 1200). More recently, this resolution has returned in the Dell XPS Laptop series, under the name "UHD+".
- 3840 × 1920 (2:1 or 18:9); this resolution is largely used by 360° videos as they largely use a 2:1 aspect ratio. The reason is to represent a 360° on the horizontal axis and a 180° on the vertical.
- 3840 × 1600 (2.40:1 or 12:5); a number of computer monitors with this resolution have been produced, the first being the 37.5-inch (95 cm) LG 38UC99-W released in 2016. This resolution is equivalent to WQXGA (2560 × 1600) extended in width by 50%, or 3840 × 2160 reduced in height by ≈26%. LG refers to this resolution as "WQHD+" (Wide Quad HD+), while Acer uses the term "UW-QHD+" (Ultra-wide Quad HD+) and some media outlets have used the term "UW4K" (Ultra-wide 4K).
- 3840 × 1080 (3.5̅5̅:1 or 32:9); this resolution was first used in the Samsung C49HG70, a 49-inch (120 cm) curved gaming monitor released in 2017. This resolution is equivalent to dual 1080p displays (1920 × 1080) side-by-side, but with no border interrupting the image. It is also exactly one half of a 4K UHD (3840 × 2160) display. Samsung refers to this resolution as "DFHD" (Dual Full HD).

== Recording ==
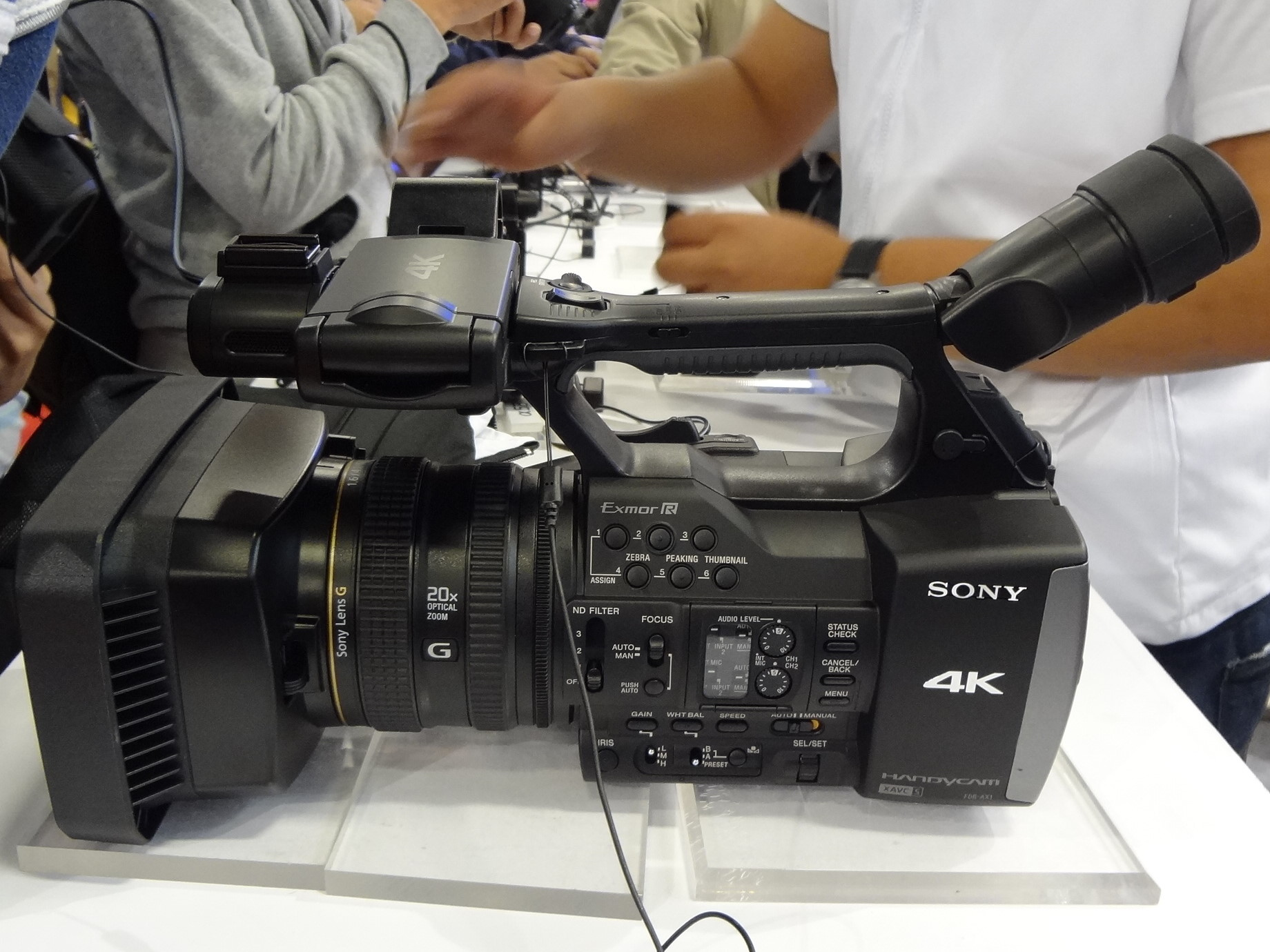
Sony Handycam FDR-AX1

=== Detail benefit ===
The main advantage of recording video at the 4K standard is that fine spatial detail is resolved well. Individual still frames extracted from 3840×2160-pixel video footage can act as 8.3 megapixel still photographs, while only 2.1 megapixels at 1080p and 0.9 megapixels at 720p. If the final video resolution is reduced to 2K from a 4K recording, more detail is apparent than would have been achieved from a native 2K recording. Increased fineness and contrast is then possible with output to DVD and Blu-ray. Some cinematographers record at 4K with the Super 35 film format to offset any resolution loss that may occur during video processing.

=== Chroma subsampling ===
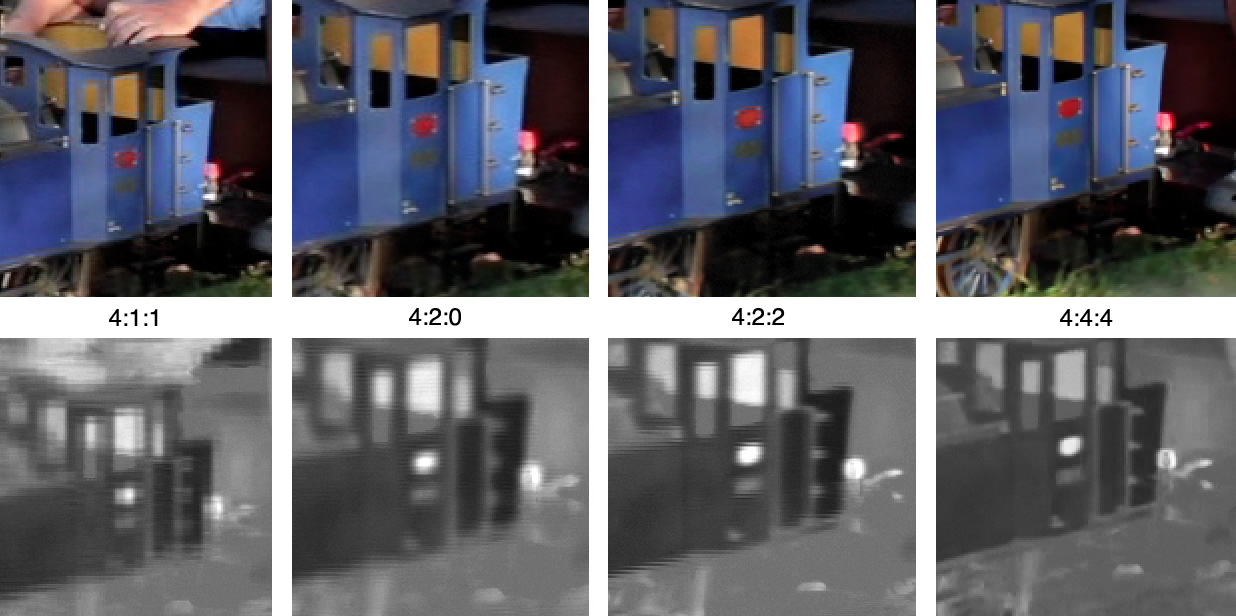
In full size, this image shows the difference between four subsampling schemes. The color images appear similar. The lower row shows the resolution of the color information.

Many consumer electronics such as mobile phones store video footage in Y′C_{B}C_{R} format with 4:2:0 chroma subsampling, which records color information at only one quarter the resolution as the brightness information. For 3840 × 2160 video, this means that the color information is only stored at 1920 × 1080.

=== Bit rates ===
Consumer cameras and mobile phones record 2160p footage at much higher bit rates (usually 50 to 100 Mbit/s) than 1080p (usually 10 to 30 Mbit/s). This higher bit rate reduces the visibility of compression artifacts, even if viewed on monitors with a lower resolution than 2160p.

== See also ==
- 1080p (Full HD) – digital video format with a resolution of 1920 × 1080, with vertical resolution of 1080 lines
- 1440p (WQHD) – vertical resolution of 1440 lines
- List of 4K video recording devices
- 2K resolution – digital video formats with a horizontal resolution of around 2,000 pixels
- 5K resolution – digital video formats with a horizontal resolution of around 5,000 pixels, aimed at non-television computer monitor usage
- 6K resolution – digital video formats with a horizontal resolution of around 6,000 pixels, aimed at non-television computer monitor usage
- 8K resolution – digital video formats with a horizontal resolution of around 8,000 pixels
- 10K resolution – digital video formats with a horizontal resolution of around 10,000 pixels
- 16K resolution – experimental VR format
- 32K resolution
- Aspect ratio (image) – proportional relationship between an image's width and height
- Digital cinema
- Display resolution standards
- High Efficiency Video Coding (HEVC) – video standard that supports 4K & 8K UHDTV and resolutions up to 8192 × 4320
- Rec. 2020 – ITU-R recommendation for UHDTV, defining formats with resolutions of 4K (3840 × 2160) and 8K (7680 × 4320)
- Ultrawide formats
