= Z20 =

Z20 could refer to:

- Harbin Z-20, a class of Chinese helicopter
- Minolta DiMAGE Z20, a digital camera model
- Mitsubishi Colt Plus Z20, an automobile model
- New South Wales Z20 class locomotive, a class of Australian steam locomotives
- Nissan Z20S, an automobile engine model
- Nubia Z20, a mobile phone model
- Toyota Z20 series, an automobile model
- Z20 Karl Galster, a German destroyer
