= Epson Moverio BT-200 =

Technological eyewear product by Epson

Epson Moverio BT-200 is a pair of binocular transparent, see-through augmented reality smartglasses produced and manufactured by Seiko Epson.

== History & development ==
At the end of 2009, Epson began developing an eyewear display intended to create the impression of a large screen for people on the move. The display needed to be small and lightweight for traveler comfort, and optically transparent so that viewers could see their surroundings while viewing multimedia content.

On November 9, 2011, the Moverio BT-100 was introduced in Japan, featuring 0.52-inch displays with qHD (960×540 pixels) display resolution, giving the impression of viewing a virtual 80-inch 3D display from a distance of 5 meters. The company initially expected to sell 10,000 units. These glasses ran on the Android 2.2 operating system and included support for Wi-Fi IEEE 802.11b/g/n (providing direct access to YouTube and web browsers) and MicroUSB. The Moverio was shipped to Japanese stores on November 25, 2011. In March 2012, Epson launched sales of the Moverio in the United States.

On January 6, 2014, Epson announced the development of the Moverio BT-200 Mobile Viewer. In addition to being 60% lighter, these glasses introduced motion control, a camera, and a more powerful central processing unit (1.2 GHz). In addition to content consumption, the new Moverio is designed for use with full augmented reality.

It was discontinued on June 30, 2019 and no longer supports MOVERIO Apps Market.

== Technical specifications ==
Data from manufacturer claim

- Type: See-Through OTG (over-the-glasses)
- Display resolution: qHD (960×540)
- Support for Miracast, Bluetooth 3.0, DLNA, and Wi-Fi IEEE 802.11b/g/n
- CPU: 1.2 GHz, dual-core
- RAM: 1 GB
- Audio: Dolby Digital Plus
- Battery life: up to 6 hours
- Internal storage: 8 GB
- SD card support: expandable up to 32 GB
- Sensors: GPS, compass, gyroscope, accelerometer
- OS: Android 4.0.4
- Camera: VGA
