= 8K resolution =

Resolutions with approximate width of 8,000 pixels

Comparison chart

Example 8K footage from the International Space Station (Select "WebM source" from the menu to view.)

8K resolution refers to an image or display resolution with a width of approximately 8,000 pixels. 8K UHD (7680 × 4320) is the highest resolution defined in the Rec. 2020 (UHDTV) standard.

8K display resolution is the next highest standard after 4K resolution. In the early 2010s, TV manufacturers pushed to make 4K a new standard by 2017. At CES 2012, the first prototype 8K TVs were unveiled by Japanese electronics corporation Sharp. Although some manufacturers anticipated that 8K might become the new standard within a few years, the feasibility of a fast transition was constrained by existing broadcasting resources.

In 2013, a transmission network's capability to carry HDTV resolution was limited by internet speeds and relied on satellite broadcast to transmit the high data rates. The demand is expected to drive the adoption of video compression standards and to place significant pressure on physical communication networks in the near future.

In 2018, few cameras had the capability to shoot video in 8K, NHK being one of the few companies to have created a small broadcasting camera with an 8K image sensor. By 2018, Red Digital Cinema camera company had delivered three 8K cameras in both a Full Frame sensor and Super 35 sensor.

As of 2026, little 8K content has been produced. LG, Sony, and TCL have stopped making 8K TVs, leaving Samsung the only major manufacturer.

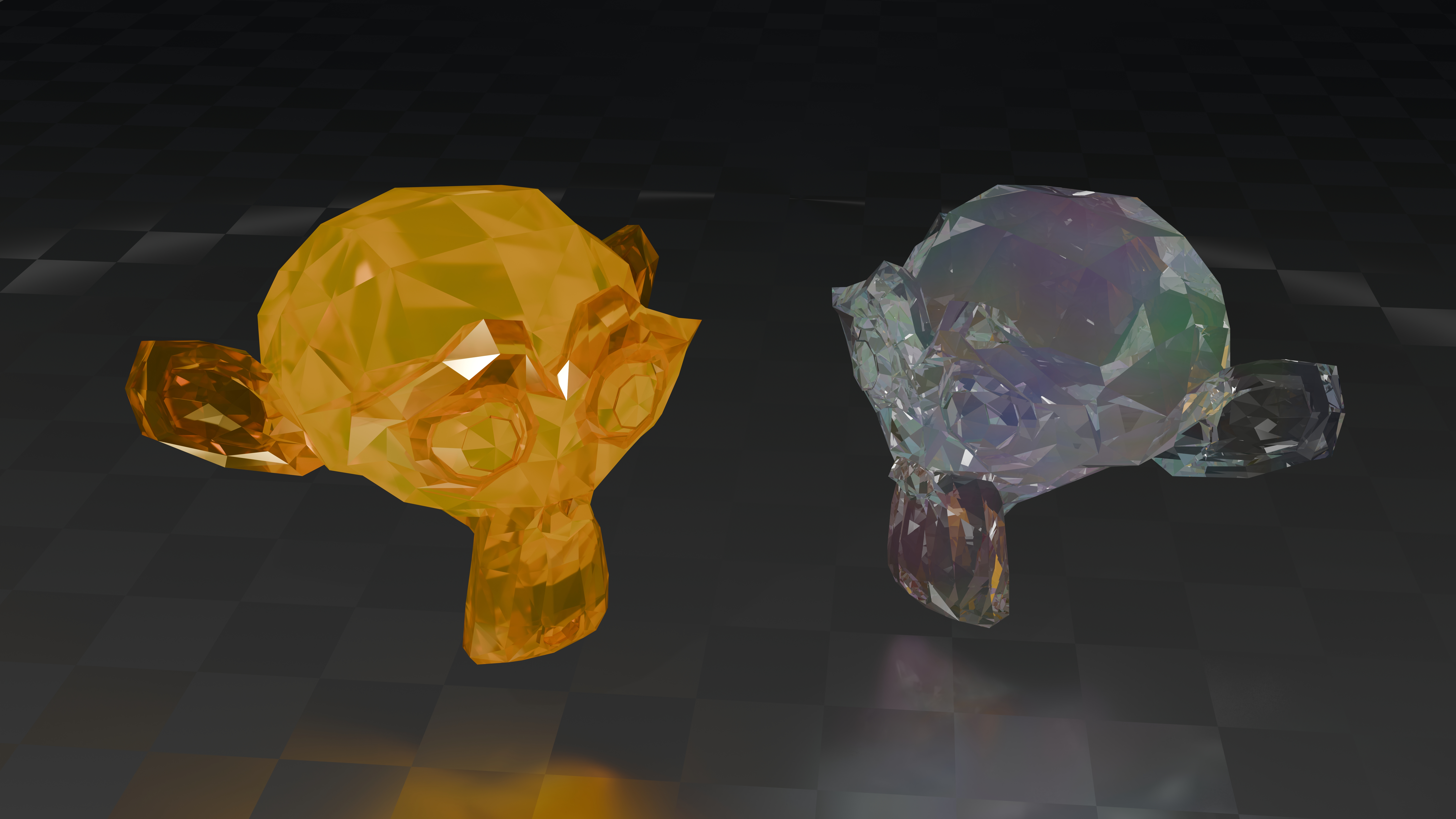
An example of an 8K image generated using Blender

== History ==
In 1986, Sony introduced a smectic light valve LCD laser projector that could display high resolutions up to 8K resolution (8000×10,000). In 1995, Japan's public broadcaster NHK was the first to start research and development of 4320p resolution, with the Super Hi-Vision system intended as a successor to their Hi-Vision HDTV system.

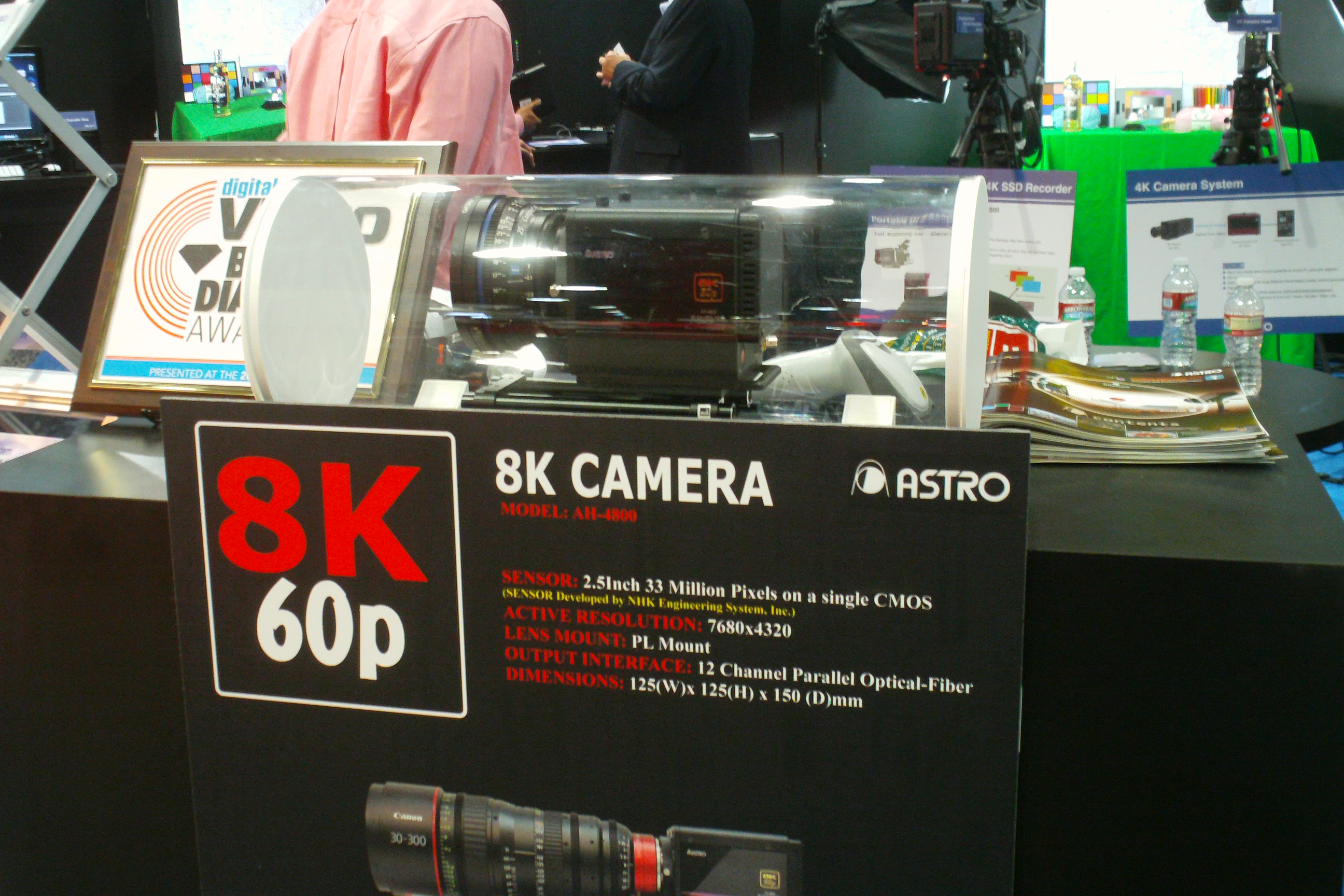
Astro Design 8K camera being displayed at the 2013 NAB Show

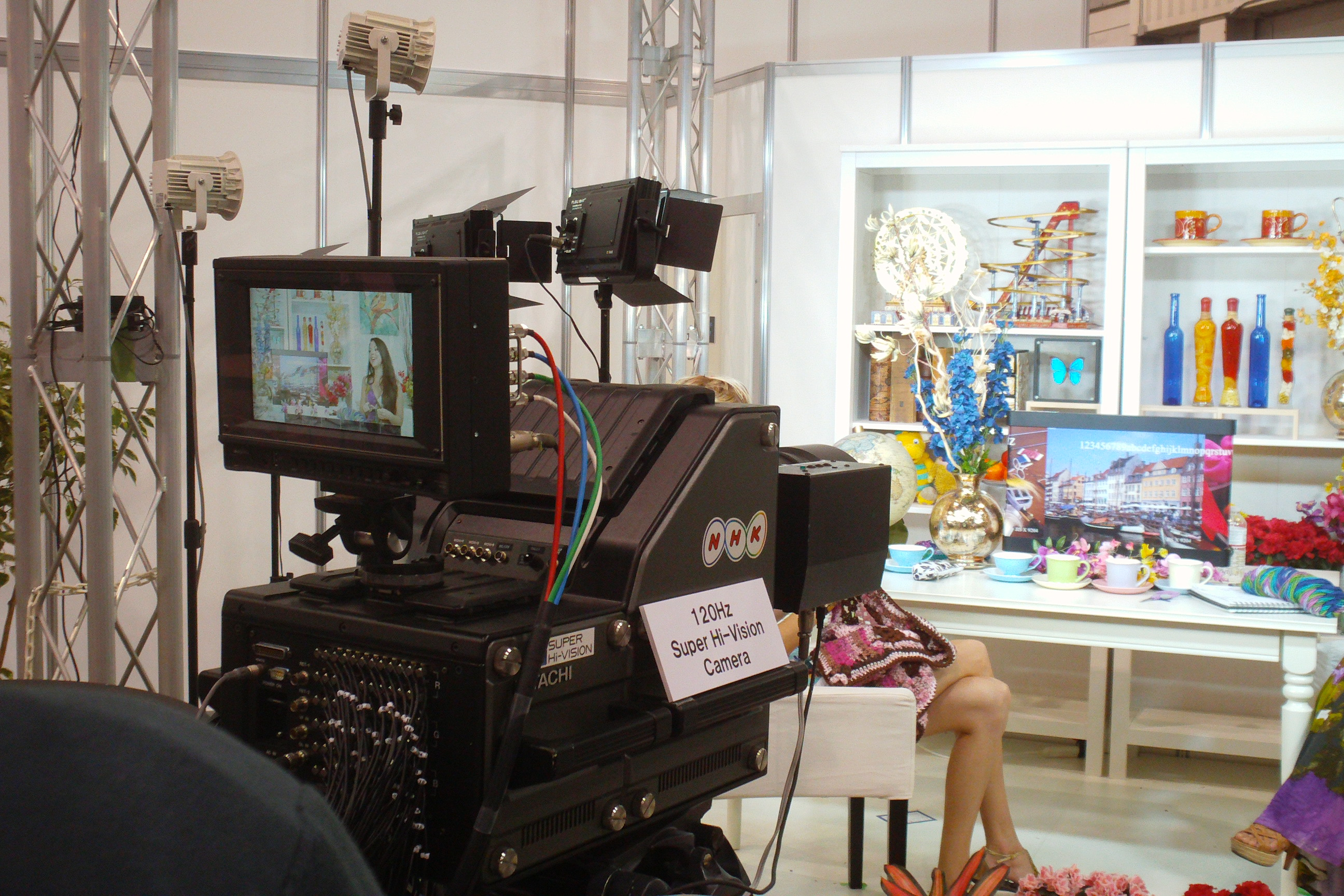
NHK and Hitachi demonstrating their 8K camera at the 2013 NAB Show

8K Ultra HDTV (UHDTV) was first demonstrated by NHK, JVC and Ikegami Tsushinki researchers with the Super Hi‑Vision system in January 2003. The format was standardized by SMPTE in October 2007. The interface was standardized by SMPTE in August 2010 and recommended as the international standard for television by ITU-R in 2012. Followed by public displays at electronics shows and screenings of 2014 Winter Olympics in Sochi and public viewings in February 2014 and the FIFA World Cup in Brazil in June 2014 using HEVC with partners AstroDesign and Ikegami Electronics.

On January 6, 2015, the MHL Consortium announced the release of the superMHL specification which will support 8K resolution at 120 fps, 48-bit video, the Rec. 2020 color space, high dynamic range support, a 32-pin reversible superMHL connector, and power charging of up to 40 watts.

On March 1, 2016, the Video Electronics Standards Association (VESA) unveiled DisplayPort 1.4, a new format that allows the use of 8K resolution (7680 × 4320) at 60 Hz with HDRR and 32 audio channels through USB-C.

On January 4, 2017, the HDMI Forum announced HDMI 2.1 featuring support for 8K video with HDR, which will be "released early in Q2 2017".

8K Association Formed at CES 2019 to Help Develop 8K Ecosystem.

In early February 2020, Samsung Electronics announced during their Unpacked event that their Samsung Galaxy S20 can video record in 8K, which uses 600 MB of storage per minute.

=== First cameras ===
On April 6, 2013, Astrodesign Inc. announced the AH-4800, capable of recording 8K resolution.

In April 2015, it was announced by Red that their newly unveiled Red Weapon VV is also capable of recording 8K footage.

In October 2016, they announced two additional 8K cameras, Red Weapon 8K S35 and Red Epic-W 8K S35. The Red Weapon Dragon VV has been discontinued as of October 7, 2017, when Red unveiled the Red Weapon Monstro VV, their fourth camera capable of shooting 8K, with additional improvements in dynamic range and noise reduction, among other features.

=== Mobile phone cameras ===
In May 2019, mobile phone vendors started releasing the first mobile phones with 8K video recording capabilities, such as the ZTE Nubia Red Magic 3 series.

This is enabled by the sufficient resolution of image sensors used in mobile phones, and by the sufficient chipset performance. However, mobile phones with up to 5K (2880p) or 6K (3240p) video cameras have never been released.

- Asus ZenFone 7
- Redmi K30 Pro
- Redmi K40
- ROG Phone 3
- Vivo X50
- Vivo X60
- LG V60 ThinQ
- Nubia Z20
- Samsung Galaxy Note 20
- Samsung Galaxy S20
- Samsung Galaxy S21
- Samsung Galaxy S22
- Samsung Galaxy S23
- Samsung Galaxy S24
- Samsung Galaxy S25
- Samsung Galaxy S26
- Xiaomi Mi 10
- Xiaomi Mi 10 Ultra
- Xiaomi Mi 10T
- Xiaomi Mi 11

=== Productions and broadcasting ===
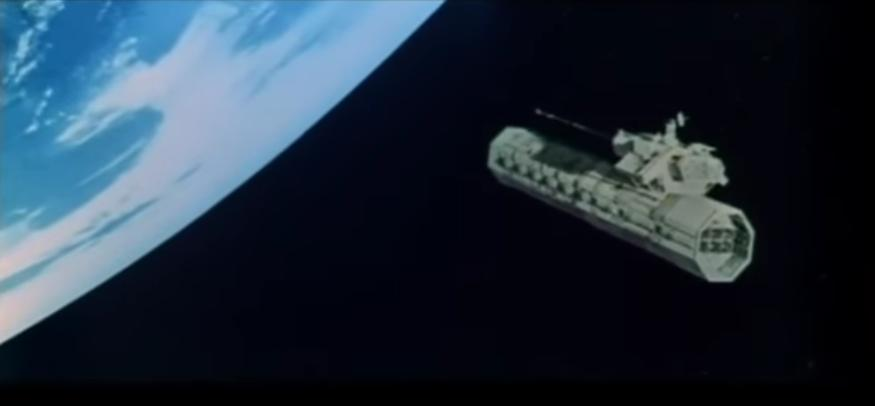
In 2018, 2001: A Space Odyssey became one of the first films to be aired in 8K resolution on television.

Hundreds of documentaries have been aired in 8K on the BS8K channel, including Yōroppa toramuno tabi (subject of the first episode — Lisbon's tram network — pictured)

In 2007, the original 65 mm negative of the 1992 film Baraka was re-scanned at 8K with a film scanner built specifically for the job at FotoKem Laboratories, and used to remaster the 2008 Blu-ray release. Chicago Sun-Times critic Roger Ebert described the Blu-ray release as "the finest video disc I have ever viewed or ever imagined." A similar 8K scan/4K intermediate digital restoration of Lawrence of Arabia was made for Blu-ray and theatrical re-release during 2012 by Sony Pictures to celebrate the film's 50th anniversary. According to Grover Crisp, executive VP of restoration at Sony Pictures, the new 8K scan has such high resolution that when examined, showed a series of fine concentric lines in a pattern "reminiscent of a fingerprint" near the top of the frame. This was caused by the film emulsion melting and cracking in the desert heat during production. Sony had to hire a third party to minimize or eliminate the rippling artifacts in the new restored version.

On May 17, 2013, the Franklin Institute premiered To Space and Back, an 8K×8K, 60 fps, 3D video running approximately 25 minutes. During its first run at the Fels Planetarium it was played at 4K, 60 fps.

In November 2013, NHK screened the experimental-drama short film "The Chorus" at Tokyo Film Festival which was filmed in 8K and 22.2 sound format.

On May 1, 2015, an 8K abstract computer animation was screened at the Filmatic Festival at the University of California, San Diego. The work was created as an assignment in the VIS 40/ICAM 40 Introduction to Computing in the Arts class taught at UCSD by Associate Teaching Professor Brett Stalbaum during the winter quarter of 2015, with each student producing three hundred 8192 × 4800 pixel frames. The work's music soundtrack was composed by Mark Matamoros.

On January 6, 2016, director James Gunn stated that the 2017 film Guardians of the Galaxy Vol. 2 would be the first feature film to be shot in 8K, using the Red Weapon 8K VV. The movie was shot with 8K cameras (and partially with 4K cameras), although the digital intermediate of the movie is in a lower resolution.

Japanese public broadcaster NHK began research and development on 8K in 1995, having spent over $1 billion on R&D since then. Codenamed Super Hi-Vision (named after its old Hi-Vision analog HDTV system), NHK also was simultaneously working on the development of 22.2 channel surround sound audio. The world's first 8K television was unveiled by Sharp at the Consumer Electronics Show (CES) in 2012. Experimental transmissions of the resolution were tested with the 2012 Summer Olympics, and at the Cannes Film Festival showcasing Beauties À La Carte, a 27-minute short showcased publicly on a 220" screen, with a three-year roadmap that entails the launch of 8K test broadcasting in 2016, with plans to roll out full 8K services by 2018, and in time for the 2020 Summer Olympics, which were delayed to 2021 due to the COVID-19 pandemic. Ultimately, about 200 hours of material from the Tokyo Olympics, including the opening and closing ceremonies, were broadcast in 8K (on the NHK BS8K channel).

The specification for an 8K Blu-ray format was also completed by the Blu-ray Disc Association for use in Japan by December 2017. As of the end of 2024, there are no standalone Blu-ray players certified as 8K capable (even though PC Blu-ray drives able to read 100 GB and 128 GB discs are sold commercially), and no home video releases in 8K on physical media by any major studio.

On December 1, 2018, NHK launched BS8K, a broadcast channel transmitting at 8K resolution. Documentaries constitute a large part of that channel's programming. Feature films shown in 8K on that channel include 2001: A Space Odyssey (1968) and My Fair Lady (1964); in both cases, 70 mm analog prints were used as a basis for the remastered 8K version. New productions filmed with digital 8K cameras have also been aired in 8K on that channel; they include the Edo period drama Kikyo – The Return and the WWII dramas Wife of a Spy and Gift of Fire.

In Germany, the third season of Das Boot (a historical drama TV series set on a Nazi submarine) was made available in 8K on the Samsung TV Plus streaming service.

In China, the state-owned CMG conglomerate launched a TV channel broadcasting at 8K resolution, known as CCTV-8K. Test broadcasts started in 2021 while the official launch was in 2022.

== Gaming ==
The Sony PlayStation 5 Pro generates 8K graphics and output, making it the first game console to do so, with the sequel to Pure Pool, Pure Pool Pro, supporting 8K resolution at 60 frames per second on the console. The GeForce RTX 3090, released in September 2020 at an MSRP of $1499, was marketed by Nvidia as the first graphics card capable of 8K 60 fps HDR gaming, recording, and streaming with ShadowPlay on PCs. However, only its successor, the GeForce RTX 4090, is often regarded as the first graphics card to achieve playable frame rates at 8K in many modern titles.

== Consumer market adoption ==
8K technology has seen adoption in a few industries, namely film and video production, medical imaging, and large format signage, where the extra resolution provides a valuable advantage.

Since 8K TVs hit the market in 2012, adoption has moved considerably slower than the jump from 1080p to 4K. As of 2026, 4K UHD is still the dominant technology with 66% revenue share of the global Smart TV market. Sales of 8K TVs remain low, while 4K TVs have seen widespread adoption. LG, Sony, and TCL have stopped making 8K TVs, leaving Samsung the only major manufacturer. Common reasons cited include the lack of differences between 4K and 8K at normal viewing distances, as well as the high costs to produce and broadcast 8K content.

In 2023, the European Union instituted a strict energy efficiency index. This led to fears that it will effectively ban 8K television sets, which did not happen, because manufacturers managed to meet the EU requirements by setting the TVs to a lower default brightness.

== Resolutions ==
Examples of 8K resolutions
| Resolution | Aspect ratio | | Total pixels |
|---|---|---|---|
| 7680 × 2160 | 3.5̅ | 32∶9 | 16.59 Mpx |
| 7680 × 2400 | 3.2 | 16∶5 | 18.43 Mpx |
| 7680 × 3200 | 2.4 | 12∶5 | 24.58 Mpx |
| 7680 × 3240 | 2.3̅7̅0̅ | 64∶27 | 24.88 Mpx |
| 7680 × 4320 | 1.7̅ | 16∶9 | 33.18 Mpx |
| 8192 × 4320 | 1.89̅6̅2̅ | 256∶135 | 35.39 Mpx |
| 8192 × 4608 | 1.7̅ | 16∶9 | 37.75 Mpx |
| 8192 × 5120 | 1.6 | 8∶5 | 41.94 Mpx |
| 8192 × 6144 | 1.3̅ | 4∶3 | 50.33 Mpx |
| 8192 × 8192 | 1 | 1∶1 | 67.11 Mpx |

=== 7680 × 4320 ===
This is the resolution of the UHDTV2 format defined in SMPTE ST 2036–1, as well as the 8K UHDTV format defined in ITU-R BT.2020. It was also chosen by the DVB project as the resolution for their 8K broadcasting standard, UHD-2. It has 33.2 million total pixels, and is double the linear resolution of 4K UHD (four times as many total pixels), three times that of 1440p (nine times as many pixels), four times that of 1080p (16 times as many pixels), and six times that of 720p (36 times as many pixels).

== See also ==
- 2K resolution – digital video formats with a horizontal resolution of around 2,000 pixels
- 4K resolution – digital video formats with a horizontal resolution of around 4,000 pixels
- 5K resolution – digital video formats with a horizontal resolution of around 5,000 pixels, aimed at non-television computer monitor usage
- 6K resolution – digital video formats with a horizontal resolution of around 6,000 pixels, aimed at non-television computer monitor usage
- 10K resolution – digital video formats with a horizontal resolution of around 10,000 pixels, aimed at non-television computer monitor usage
- 16K resolution – digital video formats with a horizontal resolution of around 16,000 pixels
- 32K resolution
- Ultra-high-definition television (UHDTV) – digital video formats with resolutions of 4K (3840 × 2160) and 8K (7680 × 4320)
- Rec. 2020 – ITU-R Recommendation for UHDTV
- Digital movie camera
- Digital cinematography – makes extensive use of UHD video
- List of large sensor interchangeable-lens video cameras
