= Nubia X =

2018 android smartphone

- Developer: Nubia Technology
- Manufacturer: Nubia Technology
- First released: October 31, 2018; 7 years ago
- Successor: Nubia Z20
- Compatible networks: 2G; 3G; 4G; LTE
- Form factor: Slate
- Dimensions: H: 154.1 mm (6.07 in); W: 73.3 mm (2.89 in); D: 8.4 mm (0.33 in)
- Weight: 181 g (6.38 oz)
- Operating system: Android 8.1 "Oreo", Nubia UI 6
- System-on-chip: Qualcomm Snapdragon 845
- CPU: Octa-core (4 × 2.65 GHz, 4 × 1.8 GHz) Kryo
- GPU: Adreno 630
- Memory: 6 or 8 GB RAM
- Storage: 64, 128, 256 or 512 GB
- Battery: 3800 mAh
- Rear camera: Dual: 16 and 24 MP; f/1.7 and f/1.8 aperture; HDR+ processing; FHD 1080p video (up to 30 FPS); 4K 2160p video (up to 30 FPS)
- Display: main: 6.26 in (159 mm) FHD+ IPS LCD, 2280 × 1080 (430 ppi) rear: 5.1 in (130 mm) HD OLED, 1520 × 720; All: Gorilla Glass 3
- Connectivity: GSM, LTE, LTE Advanced, HSDPA, CDMA, TD-SCDMA
- Website: www.nubia.com/nubiaX

The Nubia X is an Android smartphone which was launched on 31 October 2018. Given the tendency in the late 2010s toward bezelless displays, instead of trimming the display with a notch or hole for housing a front camera, it opts to use two screens (on both sides of the phone). Selfies and videocalls are made with the main camera and the rear display as viewfinder.
