= CineGrid =

U.S. non-profit organization

CineGrid was a non-profit organization based in California that began in 2004 in order to distribute 1 Gbit/s to 1 Pbps (Petabit per second) digital networks, utilize grid computing to manage digital media applications, and increase the demand for digital media exchange among remote participants in science, education, research, art and entertainment. With its headquarters at the California Institute for Telecommunications and Information Technology, renamed in 2013 as Qualcomm Institute (Qi) in San Diego, CineGrid is composed of 61 separate organizations and corporations. CineGrid has facilitated grants for its members through the National Science Foundation and provides access to Ethernet VLAN and TCP/IP connectivity.

Over its history, CineGrid co-created cultural, scientific and artistic demonstrations of high-quality networked media, especially in a format that became known as UHD 4K. In 2008, CineGrid demonstrated dual, live-streaming 4K from the Monterey Bay Aquarium to Calit2 (QualComm Institute) and on to Japan and Amsterdam. In December 2013, CineGrid held an event for the first transmission of four surgeries in very high definition (4K), in real time and simultaneously, directly from Brazil to the United States.

== Founding members ==
CineGrid is composed of innovators from scientific, artistic, and technological backgrounds. Its founding members include:

- Cisco Systems
- Keio University/Research Institute for Digital Media Content
- Lucasfilm Ltd.
- NTT Network Innovation Laboratories
- Pacific Interface Inc.
- Toronto Metropolitan University/Rogers Communications Centre
- San Francisco State University/INGI
- Sony Electronics Inc.
- University of Amsterdam
- University of California, San Diego/Calit2
- University of Illinois Urbana-Champaign/NCSA
- Electronic Visualization Laboratory
- USC School of Cinematic Arts
- University of Washington Research Channel

== Annual conference ==
Every year, CineGrid holds a conference for its member at the University of California, San Diego. At the annual meeting, members are able to present their current research and technological developments. Workshops and demonstrations are held to introduce and give members first-hand experience with new networking tools and multi-media advancements. The CineGrid International Workshop Programs include several demonstrations from the CRCA Visiting Artist Lab, CRCA Spatialized Audio Lab, AESOP Wall, Hi-Per Wall, SAGE, StarCAVE, LAVID, Laboratory of Cinematic Arts (LabCine) and the Virtulab.
