= Multi-screen video =

In the fields of broadcasting and content delivery, multiscreen video describes video content that is transformed into multiple formats, bit rates and resolutions for display on devices such as televisions, mobile phones, tablets and computers. Additional devices may include video game consoles such as the Xbox 360, or internet enabled television.

== History ==
As video moved to digital formats, content began to stream across IP networks. The term developed as more electronic devices transmitted video. Technical and advertising professionals began to refer to video content transmitted across multiple devices as multiscreen video. Notable industry usage includes The Nielsen Company, Cisco Systems and Google.

== See also ==
- Digital video
- Transcoding
- H.264/MPEG-4 AVC
- Over-the-top content
- TV Everywhere
