= Nubia Z20 =

2019 Android smartphone

- Developer: Nubia Technology
- Manufacturer: Nubia Technology
- Type: Smartphone
- Series: Z
- First released: August 16, 2019; 7 years ago (China); October 14, 2019; 7 years ago (global)
- Predecessor: Nubia X
- Compatible networks: 2G; 3G; 4G; LTE
- Form factor: Slate
- Dimensions: H: 158.6 mm (6.24 in); W: 75.2 mm (2.96 in); D: 9.2 mm (0.36 in)
- Weight: 186 g (6.56 oz)
- Operating system: Android 9 Pie, Nubia UI 7
- System-on-chip: Qualcomm Snapdragon 855+
- CPU: Octa-core (1 × 2.96 GHz, 3 × 2.42 GHz, 4 × 1.78 GHz) Kryo
- GPU: Adreno 640
- Memory: 6 or 8 GB RAM
- Storage: 128 or 512 GB
- Battery: 4000 mAh
- Rear camera: Triple: 48, 16 and 8 MP; f/1.7 aperture (main); HDR+ processing; HD 720p video (up to 1920 FPS); FHD 1080p video (up to 60 FPS); 4K 2160p video (up to 60 FPS); 8K 4320p video (up to 15 FPS)
- Display: 6.42 in (163 mm) AMOLED, FHD+ 2340×1080 (2.5 MP) (401 ppi); Gorilla Glass 5
- External display: 5.1 in (130 mm) AMOLED, HD+ 1520 × 720 (330 ppi); Gorilla Glass 5
- Sound: Loudspeaker; 32-bit/384 kHz Hi-Res audio
- Connectivity: GSM, LTE, LTE Advanced, HSDPA, CDMA, TD-SCDMA
- Model: NX627J
- Website: www.nubia.com/Z20

The Nubia Z20 is an Android smartphone which was launched globally on 14 October 2019. It has two screens (on both sides of the phone) which can operate independently.

== Design ==
The Z20 has an aluminum and glass build. Both the front and back have curved glass. Capacitive fingerprint sensors are located on both sides of the phone and can be used to switch displays. The device is available in Twilight Blue and Diamond Black.

== Specifications ==
=== Hardware ===
It is powered by the Qualcomm Snapdragon 855+ CPU and the Adreno 640 GPU. It is available with 128 or 512 GB of non-expandable storage and 6 or 8 GB of RAM.

=== Display ===
An AMOLED panel is used for both displays, with a 6.42-inch (163mm) 1080p 19.5:9 screen on the front and a smaller 5.1-inch (129.5mm) 720p 19:9 screen on the back. Both are protected by Gorilla Glass 5, and support HDR10.

=== Camera ===
A triple camera setup is used, with a 48 MP main lens, a 16 MP ultrawide lens, and an 8 MP telephoto lens. The main lens has PDAF and OIS. It is capable of recording 1080p or 4K video at either 30 or 60 fps, and can also shoot 8K at 15 fps and 720p ultra slow-motion at 1920fps. A dual-LED flash is located to the left of the camera module, with another single-LED flash to the right.

=== Battery ===
The Z20 has a 4000mAh battery and can fast charge at up to 27W over USB-C.

== Software ==
The Z20 runs on Nubia UI 7, which is based on Android 9 Pie.
