= 1440p =

Family of video display resolutions

1440p is a family of video display resolutions that have a resolution of 1440 pixels on one side. In a display with a landscape orientation, 1440p refers to the vertical resolution. The p stands for progressive scan, i.e. non-interlaced. The 1440 pixel vertical resolution is double the vertical resolution of 720p, and one-third (about 33.3%) more than 1080p. QHD (Quad HD) or WQHD (Wide Quad HD) is the designation for a commonly used display resolution of 2560 × 1440 pixels in a 16:9 aspect ratio. As a graphics display resolution between 1080p and 4K, Quad HD is often used in smartphone displays, and for computer and console gaming.

== Support ==
Comparison of 1440p resolutions
Resolution	Display aspect ratio	Megapixels
5120 × 1440	3.5̅ (32:9)	7.37
3440 × 1440	2.38̅ (43:18)	4.95
3360 × 1440	2.3̅ (21:9)	4.84
3200 × 1440	2.2̅ (20:9)	4.61
3120 × 1440	2.16̅ (39:18)	4.49
3040 × 1440	2.1̅ (19:9)	4.38
2960 × 1440	2.05̅ (37:18)	4.26
2880 × 1440	2 (18:9)	4.15
2560 × 1440	1.7̅ (16:9)	3.69
2304 × 1440	1.6 (16:10)	3.32
2160 × 1440	1.5 (3:2)	3.11
1920 × 1440	1.3̅ (4:3)	2.76

1440p video mastered from 4:3 ratio content can be displayed with 1920×1440 or higher resolution such as QXGA or 2304×1440 with scaling, windowboxing, or pillarboxing. Widescreen 16:9 aspect ratio 1440p requires 2560×1440 (WQHD) resolution, possible with WQXGA, 2560×1920, or higher resolution with letterboxing, scaling, or windowboxing. The HDMI 1.3 specification supports WQXGA, and hence widescreen 1440p.

== Usage ==
Early 1440p computer displays became commonly available in 2010. Dell's UltraSharp U2711 monitor was released in 2010 as WQHD, with a 1440p widescreen. The 27-inch Apple LED Cinema Display released in 2010 also had a native resolution of 2560 × 1440, as did the Apple Thunderbolt Display which was sold from July 2011 to June 2016. MacBook with Retina Display (2012) is also one of the earliest laptops that utilise 1440p widescreen.

By 2020, 1440p had expanded to a common resolution for computer gaming, with multiple video cards available that supported high frame rates at that resolution. In early 2021, QHD gaming laptops with fast refresh rates were introduced by multiple computer manufacturers.

According to Steam's July 2024 Hardware & Software Survey, the resolution 2560 x 1440 has increased in overall usage on Steam by ~0.7% from May 2024, totaling to ~20% of its total userbase.

In relation to smartphones, 1440p displays are sometimes marketed as "Quad HD", as it is four times the resolution of 720p high definition. The Vivo Xplay 3S, released December 2013, was the first smartphone to use a 1440p display; by 2015, 1440p had seen wider adoption by high-end flagship smartphones from major companies. An example of a smartphone with a 1440p display is the 1st generation Google Pixel XL.

In September 2020, Microsoft revealed the Xbox Series S would support a resolution of 1440p at 120 FPS.

In July 2022, Sony added 1440p support for the PlayStation 5.

In April 2025, Nintendo revealed the Nintendo Switch 2 would support a resolution of 1440p at 120 FPS output via HDMI when playing in TV mode.

== Application of "2K" to 2560 × 1440 ==
The label "2K" is sometimes used to refer to 2560 × 1440 (commonly known as 1440p). This is inconsistent with "4K" denoting approximately 4,000 horizontal pixels, which makes 1920 or 2048 pixels wide the closest to "2K", a label which predates the use of 2560 × 1440. Some sources and manufacturers prefer "2.5K" as a term for 2560 × 1440 to avoid this confusion, and there is a similar "2.7K" (2720 × 1530) used by some drones, as well as a "2.8K" (2880 × 1620).

== See also ==
- 2K resolution
- 4K resolution
- 5K resolution
- 8K resolution
