= 6K resolution =

Display format

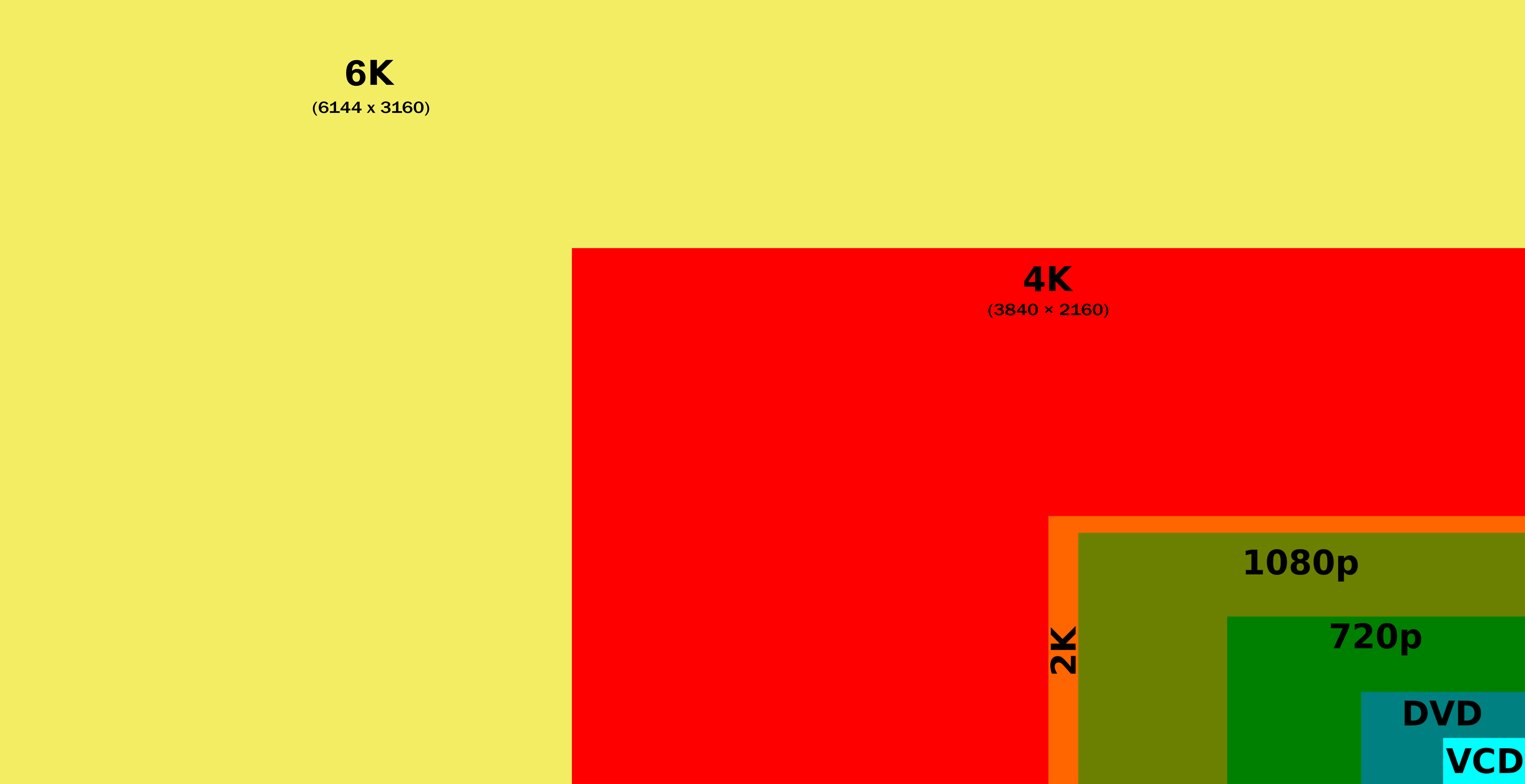
Comparison of 6K to other smaller display formats

6K resolution refers to display formats with a horizontal resolution of around 6,000 pixels and a vertical resolution of around 3,000 pixels. The exact number may vary depending on the aspect ratio and pixel shape. 6K resolution is higher than 4K resolution, which has about 4,000 pixels horizontally, and lower than 8K resolution, which has about 8,000 pixels horizontally.

6K resolution is mainly used for digital cinema and professional video production, as it offers more detail and clarity than lower resolutions. Some cameras, such as the RED WEAPON 6K Camera, can capture video in 6K resolution. However, there are not many displays that can show 6K resolution natively, as they are very expensive and rare.

As of 2023, two professional 6K monitors are available for consumer market: Apple Pro Display XDR and Dell UltraSharp U3224KB, with a resolution of 6016 × 3384, and 6144 × 3456, respectively, putting their pixel count to more than 20 million. In 2026, further professional 6K monitor was introduced: Dell UltraSharp 52 Thunderbolt Hub Monitor - U5226KW, with a resolution of 6144 × 2560. In November 2025, LG released the UltraFine evo 6K (32U990A), a 32-inch monitor with a resolution of 6144 × 3456, the first 6K monitor to launch with Thunderbolt 5 connectivity. In 2026, further professional 6K monitors were introduced, including the Dell UltraSharp 52 Thunderbolt Hub Monitor(U5226KW), with a resolution of 6144 × 2560.

6K resolution is not a standard or common resolution for consumer devices, such as TVs, smartphones, or laptops. Most of them use lower resolutions, such as Full HD (1920 x 1080), Quad HD (2560 x 1440), or Ultra HD (3840 x 2160). These resolutions are more compatible with the content and media available for consumers, and they also require less bandwidth and storage space than higher resolutions.
