= Protozoa Pictures =

American production company

- Type: Private
- Industry: Motion picture
- Founded: 1997; 29 years ago
- Founder: Darren Aronofsky
- Headquarters: New York City, United States
- Key people: Ari Handel; Darren Aronofsky; Dylan Golden; Cat Hobbs; Elizabeth Gesas; Brendan Naylor
- Products: Film Production
- Website: protozoa.com

Protozoa Pictures is an American production company founded in 1997 by American filmmaker Darren Aronofsky, headquartered in New York City. Protozoa has produced award-winning work that spans film, television, documentary, theater, podcasts, books, graphic novels and technology. The company’s output, including Requiem for a Dream, The Wrestler, Black Swan, Jackie and The Whale, has amassed over a dozen Academy Award nominations. It also produced Postcard from Earth, an inaugural show for the Las Vegas Sphere that has sold 4 million tickets and earned over 500 million dollars.

The company is named after a short film Aronofsky made in 1993, and also reflects his interest in exploring the fundamental aspects of human existence, often delving into themes of obsession, transformation, and the struggle for identity. The name also derives from the single-celled eukaryotes of the same name, which are depicted in the company's logo.

Having previously partnered with Regency Enterprises, HBO and Dimension Films, Protozoa currently has ongoing deals with Disney/NatGeo and Sony for the development of film and TV content. The company has maintained a long-standing collaboration with major studios and distributors, including Searchlight Pictures, Paramount Pictures and A24, while championing independent voices across multimedia narrative formats.

== Filmography ==
Year	Film	Director	Production company(s)	Distributor
1998	Pi	Darren Aronofsky	—	Artisan Entertainment
2000	Requiem for a Dream	Darren Aronofsky	—	Artisan Entertainment
2002	Below	David Twohy	Dimension Films	Miramax Films
2006	The Fountain	Darren Aronofsky	Regency Enterprises	Warner Bros.
2008	The Wrestler	Darren Aronofsky	Wild Bunch	Fox Searchlight Pictures
2010	Black Swan	Darren Aronofsky	Cross Creek Pictures / Phoenix Pictures / Dune Entertainment	Fox Searchlight Pictures
2012	2 Days in New York	Julie Delpy		Magnolia Pictures
2014	Noah	Darren Aronofsky	Regency Enterprises	Paramount Pictures
2015	Zipper	Mora Stephens	—	Alchemy
2016	Jackie	Pablo Larraín	LD Entertainment / Wild Bunch / Why Not Productions / Bliss Media	Fox Searchlight Pictures
2017	Aftermath	Elliott Lester	MoviePass Films / Grindstone Entertainment Group	Lionsgate Premiere
2017	Mother!	Darren Aronofsky	—	Paramount Pictures
2018	White Boy Rick	Yann Demange	Columbia Pictures	Sony Pictures Releasing
2020	Some Kind of Heaven	Lance Oppenheim	The New York Times / Los Angeles Media Fund / 30West	Magnolia Pictures
2021	Catch the Fair One	Josef Kubota Wladyka	The Population	IFC Films
2022	The Territory	Alex Pritz	Real Lava, TIME Studios, XTR, Passion Pictures, Documist	National Geographic Documentary Films
2022	The Whale	Darren Aronofsky	A24	A24
2022	The Good Nurse	Tobias Lindholm	FilmNation Entertainment	Netflix
2023	Postcard from Earth	Darren Aronofsky	Sphere Studios	Sphere Entertainment Co.
2024	Viktor	Olivier Sarbil	Impact Partners, Time Studios, Newen Studios, Real Lava	
2025	Holding Liat	Brandon Kramer	Meridian Hill Pictures, Kartemquin Films	
2025	Lowland Kids	Sandra Winther	Real Lava, Misfits Entertainment, Passion Pictures, MBK, Evoke Media, Minderoo Pictures, RandomGood Films	
2025	Caught Stealing	Darren Aronofsky	Columbia Pictures	Sony Pictures Releasing
2027	Pendulum	Mark Heyman	Motel Mojave / C2	Vertical
TBA	Adrift	Darren Aronofsky	Metro-Goldwyn-Mayer / Blumhouse Productions / Paradox / Paper Pictures	Amazon MGM Studios
TBA	Nothing, Except Everything	Wesley Wang	TriStar Pictures	Sony Pictures Releasing
TBA	Chip War	Theo Anthony	Memory / Sandbox Films / Impact Partners / Cranium Productions	
