= David Bolen =

David Bolen may refer to:

- Dave Bolen (1923–2022), American athlete, diplomat and businessman
- David Bolen (cinematographer), Canadian filmmaker
