= List of television production companies =

This is a list of television production companies, sorted by country.

== Egypt ==
- Studio Misr
- Lotus Film Production
- Ramses Naguib
- Salah Zulfikar Films
- Mary Queeny Films
- Egyptian Media Production City
- Dollar Film
- New Century Production

== India ==
- Balaji Telefilms
- StarPlus
- Sun Pictures
- Magic Moments Motion Pictures
- Essel Group

== Netherlands ==
- Endemol Shine Group

== Thailand ==
- Tero Entertainment
- GMMTV
- GMM Bravo
- Kantana Group
- TV Thunder
- Workpoint Entertainment

== United Kingdom ==
- Warner Bros. Television Productions UK
- AJK TV
- Aardman Animations
- BBC Studios
- BBC Television
- Fremantle
- HIT Entertainment
- ITV Studios
- Ragdoll Productions
- Talkback (established 1981)
- Tiger Aspect Productions

== United States ==
=== Major ===
- NBCUniversal Media Group
  - Universal Television
  - Universal Content Productions
- Sony
  - Sony Pictures Television
- Disney Entertainment Television
  - Disney Television Studios
    - 20th Television
  - Marvel Television
  - Onyx Collective
- Skydance
  - CBS Studios
  - Paramount Television Studios
  - Warner Bros. Television Studios
  - William's Street
- Amazon MGM Studios
  - Metro-Goldwyn-Mayer Television
- Fox Corporation
  - Fox Entertainment

=== Other American studios ===
- Actual Films
- Castle Rock Entertainment
- Edgeline Films
- Fake Empire
- Family Owned
- Fazekas & Butters
- Goddard Textiles
- Mutant Enemy Productions
- Proximity Media
- Tall Girls Productions

== See also ==
- List of film production companies
