= List of accolades received by Black Swan =

Black Swan awards and nominations
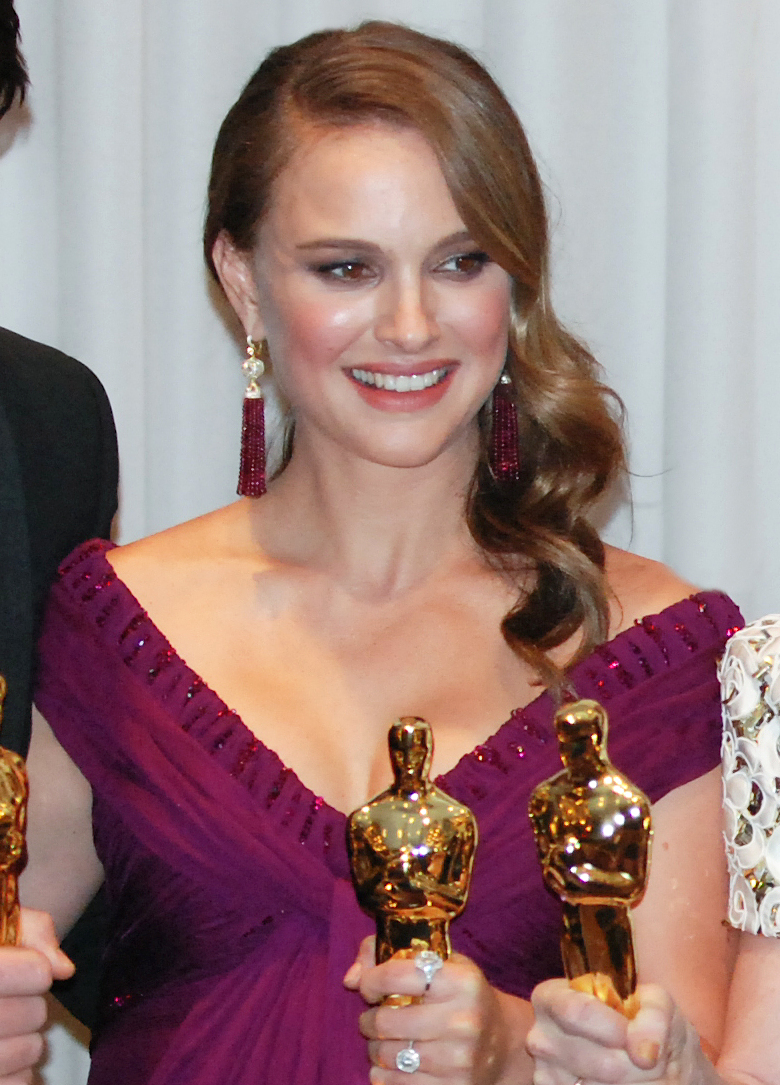
- Natalie Portman gained much attention from critics and audiences, and won several acting awards.
Awards and nominations
Award	Wins	Nominations
Academy Awards	1	5
Argentine Academy of Cinematography Arts and Sciences Awards	1	0
Alliance of Women Film Journalists	6	12
American Cinema Editors	0	1
American Film Institute	1	1
American Society of Cinematographers	0	1
Art Directors Guild	1	1
Austin Film Critics Association	5	5
Boston Society of Film Critics	2	2
British Academy Film Awards	1	12
Broadcast Film Critics Association	1	12
César Awards	0	1
Cinema Audio Society Awards	0	1
Chicago Film Critics Association	2	6
Costume Designers Guild	1	1
Dallas–Fort Worth Film Critics Association	2	4
David di Donatello	0	1
Detroit Film Critics Society	0	1
Directors Guild of America	0	1
Empire Awards	0	2
Florida Film Critics Circle	1	1
Golden Globe Awards	1	4
Gotham Awards	0	1
Houston Film Critics Society	1	4
Independent Spirit Awards	4	4
Indiana Film Critics Association	1	2
Iowa Film Critics	1	1
Kansas City Film Critics Circle	1	1
Las Vegas Film Critics Society	2	10
London Film Critics' Circle	0	3
London Film Festival Awards	0	1
Los Angeles Film Critics Association	1	1
MTV Movie Awards	0	4
National Movie Awards	0	2
New York Film Critics Circle	1	1
New York Film Critics Online	3	3
North Texas Film Critics Association	1	1
Oklahoma Film Critics Circle	2	3
Online Film Critics Society	1	7
Phoenix Film Critics Society	1	3
Producers Guild of America	0	1
San Diego Film Critics Society	1	7
San Francisco Film Critics Circle	2	2
Saturn Awards	2	5
St. Louis Film Critics Association	1	6
Satellite Awards	0	5
Scream Awards	3	7
Screen Actors Guild	1	3
Southeastern Film Critics Association	1	1
Teen Choice Awards	2	4
Toronto Film Critics Association	0	3
Utah Film Critics Association	1	3
Vancouver Film Critics Circle	0	3
Venice Film Festival	1	2
Visual Effects Society	0	1
Writers Guild of America	0	1
Washington D.C. Area Film Critics Association	0	7

Totals (Note: Certain award groups do not simply award one winner. They acknowledge several different recipients, have runners-up, and have third place. Since this is a specific recognition and is different from losing an award, runner-up mentions are considered wins in this award tally. For simplification and to avoid errors, each award in this list has been presumed to have had a prior nomination.)
- Wins: 61
- Nominations: 188

Black Swan is a 2010 independent psychological horror film directed by Darren Aronofsky. It premiered as the opening film for the 67th Venice International Film Festival. The film had a limited release in selected cities in North America on December 3 and took in a total of about $415,800 on its opening day. After Black Swan's opening weekend it grossed over $1.4 million, averaging around $80,200 per theater, the second highest per location for the opening weekend of 2010. When Black Swan finished its worldwide theatrical run, it had achieved blockbuster status with ticket revenue amounting to more than $325 million. Critics appreciated the film, with review aggregator website Rotten Tomatoes reporting an approval rating of 85 percent and placed it among their lists for the year's best films.

Black Swan has received honors in categories ranging mostly from recognition of the film itself, to its cinematography, direction and editing, to the cast's performance, particularly Natalie Portman's portrayal of the film's protagonist, ballerina Nina Sayers. The film was submitted for consideration for the Golden Lion at Venice's International Film Festival, but lost to Sofia Coppola's Somewhere. Mila Kunis was later given the Emerging Performer award for her portrayal of Nina's rival Lily, at the same ceremony. Darren Arnonofsky also earned a nomination from the Directors Guild of America for Outstanding Achievement in Feature Film. He was also named Best Director by the San Diego Film Critics Society and San Francisco Film Critics Circle Awards. The Visual Effects Society and Cinema Audio Society Awards each gave the film a single nomination, while Amy Westcott won for her work on Black Swan's contemporary costumes from the Costume Designers Guild.

Natalie Portman has won a majority of the critic awards given to actresses for a leading 2010 film role. Out of the four nominations received from the 68th Golden Globe Awards, its only win was Best Actress in a Motion Picture – Drama, for Portman. It also received five Academy Award nominations, which included Best Picture, Best Director, Best Actress, Best Cinematography and Best Film Editing, Of those, its sole win was for Best Actress. More recognition for the film came from the Screen Actors Guild at their 17th annual ceremony, awarding Portman in her respective field as well as nominating the entire cast. A kiss shared between Kunis and Portman in Black Swan was nominated at the viewer-voted MTV Movie Awards and Teen Choice Awards.

Black Swan swept the Austin Film Critics Association and Independent Spirit Awards, winning five and four awards respectively. The film also won three awards at both the New York Film Critics Awards and the Oklahoma Film Critics Awards, and received a record 12 Broadcast Film Critics Association nominations. At the latter, the film was nominated in vastly different categories, ranging from its production design, to costumes and makeup to its soundtrack. Black Swan performed similarly at the 64th British Academy Film Awards, again with 12 nominations, and was also nominated in similar categories. Another organization to laud the film with the same number of nominations was the Alliance of Women Film Journalists. They recognized Black Swan in categories including Most Beautiful Film and its depiction of sexuality, but despite Aronofsky's feature winning Best Film, it was also nominated in their "Movie You Wanted To Love But Just Couldn't" category.

== Awards and nominations ==
Award	Date of ceremony^{[I]}	Category	Recipients and nominees	Outcome
Academy Awards	February 27, 2011	Best Picture	Mike Medavoy, Brian Oliver and Scott Franklin	Nominated
Academy Awards	February 27, 2011	Best Director	Darren Aronofsky	Nominated
Academy Awards	February 27, 2011	Best Actress	Natalie Portman	Won
Academy Awards	February 27, 2011	Best Cinematography	Matthew Libatique	Nominated
Academy Awards	February 27, 2011	Best Film Editing	Andrew Weisblum	Nominated
Argentine Academy of Cinematography Arts and Sciences Awards	December 12, 2011	Best Foreign Film	Black Swan	Won
Alliance of Women Film Journalists	January 10, 2011	Beautiful Film	Black Swan	Nominated
Alliance of Women Film Journalists	January 10, 2011	Best Actress	Natalie Portman	Nominated
Alliance of Women Film Journalists	January 10, 2011	Best Cinematography	Matthew Libatique	Won
Alliance of Women Film Journalists	January 10, 2011	Best Depiction Of Nudity, Sexuality, or Seduction	Black Swan	Nominated
Alliance of Women Film Journalists	January 10, 2011	Best Director	Darren Aronofsky	Won
Alliance of Women Film Journalists	January 10, 2011	Best Editing	Andrew Weisblum	Won
Alliance of Women Film Journalists	January 10, 2011	Best Film	Black Swan	Won
Alliance of Women Film Journalists	January 10, 2011	Best Original Screenplay	Mark Heyman, Andres Heinz and John McLaughlin	Nominated
Alliance of Women Film Journalists	January 10, 2011	Best Score	Clint Mansell	Nominated
Alliance of Women Film Journalists	January 10, 2011	Bravest Performance Award	Natalie Portman	Won
Alliance of Women Film Journalists	January 10, 2011	Movie You Wanted To Love But Just Couldn't	Black Swan	Nominated
Alliance of Women Film Journalists	January 10, 2011	Unforgettable Moment Award	Black Swan	Won
American Cinema Editors	February 19, 2011	Best Edited Feature Film (Dramatic)	Andrew Weisblum	Nominated
American Film Institute	December 12, 2010	AFI Movies of the Year	Black Swan	Won
American Society of Cinematographers	February 13, 2011	Outstanding Achievement in Cinematography	Matthew Libatique	Nominated
Art Directors Guild	5 February 2011	Excellence in Production Design of a Contemporary Film	Therese DePrez	Won
Austin Film Critics Association	December 19, 2010	Best Actress	Natalie Portman	Won
Austin Film Critics Association	December 19, 2010	Best Cinematography	Matthew Libatique	Won
Austin Film Critics Association	December 19, 2010	Best Director	Darren Aronofsky	Won
Austin Film Critics Association	December 19, 2010	Best Film	Black Swan	Won
Austin Film Critics Association	December 19, 2010	Best Original Screenplay	Mark Heyman, Andres Heinz and John McLaughlin	Won
Boston Society of Film Critics	December 12, 2010	Best Actress	Natalie Portman	Won
Boston Society of Film Critics	December 12, 2010	Best Film Editing	Andrew Weisblum	Won
British Academy Film Awards	February 13, 2011	Best Actress	Natalie Portman	Won
British Academy Film Awards	February 13, 2011	Best Cinematography	Matthew Libatique	Nominated
British Academy Film Awards	February 13, 2011	Best Costume Design	Amy Westcott	Nominated
British Academy Film Awards	February 13, 2011	Best Director	Darren Aronofsky	Nominated
British Academy Film Awards	February 13, 2011	Best Editing	Andrew Weisblum	Nominated
British Academy Film Awards	February 13, 2011	Best Film	Black Swan	Nominated
British Academy Film Awards	February 13, 2011	Best Makeup and Hair	Judy Chin and Geordie Sheffer	Nominated
British Academy Film Awards	February 13, 2011	Best Original Screenplay	Mark Heyman, Andrés Heinz and John McLaughlin	Nominated
British Academy Film Awards	February 13, 2011	Best Production Design	Thérèse DePrez and Tora Peterson	Nominated
British Academy Film Awards	February 13, 2011	Best Sound	Ken Ishii, Craig Henighan and Dominick Tavella	Nominated
British Academy Film Awards	February 13, 2011	Best Supporting Actress	Barbara Hershey	Nominated
British Academy Film Awards	February 13, 2011	Best Special Visual Effects	Dan Schrecker	Nominated
Broadcast Film Critics Association	January 14, 2011	Best Actress	Natalie Portman	Won
Broadcast Film Critics Association	January 14, 2011	Best Art Direction	Therese DePrez and Tora Peterson	Nominated
Broadcast Film Critics Association	January 14, 2011	Best Cinematography	Matthew Libatique	Nominated
Broadcast Film Critics Association	January 14, 2011	Best Composer	Clint Mansell	Nominated
Broadcast Film Critics Association	January 14, 2011	Best Costume Design	Amy Westcott	Nominated
Broadcast Film Critics Association	January 14, 2011	Best Director	Darren Aronofsky	Nominated
Broadcast Film Critics Association	January 14, 2011	Best Editing	Andrew Weisblum	Nominated
Broadcast Film Critics Association	January 14, 2011	Best Makeup	Judy Chin	Nominated
Broadcast Film Critics Association	January 14, 2011	Best Picture	Black Swan	Nominated
Broadcast Film Critics Association	January 14, 2011	Best Screenplay	Mark Heyman, Andres Heinz and John McLaughlin	Nominated
Broadcast Film Critics Association	January 14, 2011	Best Sound	Brian Emrich	Nominated
Broadcast Film Critics Association	January 14, 2011	Best Supporting Actress	Mila Kunis	Nominated
César Awards	February 24, 2012	Best Foreign Film	Black Swan	Nominated
Cinema Audio Society Awards	February 19, 2011	Best Sound in a Motion Picture	Black Swan	Nominated
Chicago Film Critics Association	December 20, 2010	Best Actress	Natalie Portman	Won
Chicago Film Critics Association	December 20, 2010	Best Cinematography	Matthew Libatique	Nominated
Chicago Film Critics Association	December 20, 2010	Best Director	Darren Aronofsky	Nominated
Chicago Film Critics Association	December 20, 2010	Best Film	Black Swan	Nominated
Chicago Film Critics Association	December 20, 2010	Best Original Score	Clint Mansell	Won
Chicago Film Critics Association	December 20, 2010	Best Original Screenplay	Mark Heyman, Andres Heinz and John McLaughlin	Nominated
Costume Designers Guild	February 22, 2011	Excellence in Contemporary Film	Amy Westcott	Won
Dallas–Fort Worth Film Critics Association	December 17, 2010	Best Actress	Natalie Portman	Won
Dallas–Fort Worth Film Critics Association	December 17, 2010	Best Director	Darren Aronofsky	Nominated
Dallas–Fort Worth Film Critics Association	December 17, 2010	Best Supporting Actress	Mila Kunis	Nominated
Dallas–Fort Worth Film Critics Association	December 17, 2010	Top 10 Films	Black Swan	Won
David di Donatello	May 6, 2011	Best International Film	Black Swan	Nominated
Detroit Film Critics Society	December 16, 2010	Best Actress	Natalie Portman	Nominated
Directors Guild of America	January 29, 2011	Best Director	Darren Aronofsky	Nominated
Empire Awards	March 27, 2011	Best Actress	Natalie Portman	Nominated
Empire Awards	March 27, 2011	Best Thriller	Black Swan	Nominated
Florida Film Critics Circle	December 20, 2010	Best Actress	Natalie Portman	Won
Golden Eagle Award	January 27, 2012	Best Foreign Language Film	Black Swan	Nominated
Golden Globe Award	January 16, 2011	Best Actress – Motion Picture Drama	Natalie Portman	Won
Golden Globe Award	January 16, 2011	Best Director	Darren Aronofsky	Nominated
Golden Globe Award	January 16, 2011	Best Motion Picture – Drama	Black Swan	Nominated
Golden Globe Award	January 16, 2011	Best Supporting Actress – Motion Picture	Mila Kunis	Nominated
Gotham Awards	November 28, 2010	Best Feature	Black Swan	Nominated
Houston Film Critics Society	December 18, 2010	Best Actress	Natalie Portman	Won
Houston Film Critics Society	December 18, 2010	Best Cinematography	Matthew Libatique	Nominated
Houston Film Critics Society	December 18, 2010	Best Director	Darren Aronofsky	Nominated
Houston Film Critics Society	December 18, 2010	Best Picture	Black Swan	Nominated
Independent Spirit Awards	February 26, 2011	Best Cinematography	Matthew Libatique	Won
Independent Spirit Awards	February 26, 2011	Best Director	Darren Aronofsky	Won
Independent Spirit Awards	February 26, 2011	Best Female Lead	Natalie Portman	Won
Independent Spirit Awards	February 26, 2011	Best Film	Black Swan	Won
Indiana Film Critics Association	December 12, 2010	Best Actress	Natalie Portman	Won
Indiana Film Critics Association	December 12, 2010	Best Film	Black Swan	Nominated
Iowa Film Critics	January 13, 2011	Best Actress	Natalie Portman	Won
Kansas City Film Critics Circle	January 2, 2011	Best Actress	Natalie Portman	Won
Las Vegas Film Critics Society	December 17, 2010	Best Actress	Natalie Portman	Won
Las Vegas Film Critics Society	December 17, 2010	Best Art Direction	David Stein	Won
Las Vegas Film Critics Society	December 17, 2010	Best Cinematography	Matthew Libatique	Nominated
Las Vegas Film Critics Society	December 17, 2010	Best Costume Design	Amy Westcott	Nominated
Las Vegas Film Critics Society	December 17, 2010	Best Director	Darren Aronofsky	Nominated
Las Vegas Film Critics Society	December 17, 2010	Best Editing	Andrew Weisblum	Nominated
Las Vegas Film Critics Society	December 17, 2010	Best Film	Black Swan	Nominated
Las Vegas Film Critics Society	December 17, 2010	Best Score	Clint Mansell	Nominated
Las Vegas Film Critics Society	December 17, 2010	Best Screenplay	Mark Heyman, Andres Heinz and John McLaughlin	Nominated
Las Vegas Film Critics Society	December 17, 2010	Best Supporting Actress	Mila Kunis	Nominated
London Film Critics' Circle	February 10, 2011	Actress of the Year	Natalie Portman	Nominated
London Film Critics' Circle	February 10, 2011	Director of the Year	Darren Aronofsky	Nominated
London Film Critics' Circle	February 10, 2011	Film of the Year	Black Swan	Nominated
BFI London Film Festival	October 27, 2010	Best Film	Black Swan	Nominated
Los Angeles Film Critics Association	December 12, 2010	Best Cinematography	Matthew Libatique	Won
Motion Picture Sound Editors	February 20, 2011	Best Sound Editing - Dialogue and ADR for Feature Film	Craig Henighan, Jill Purdy, Nelson Ferreira	Nominated
MTV Movie Awards	June 5, 2011	Best Female Performance	Natalie Portman	Nominated
MTV Movie Awards	June 5, 2011	Best Jaw Dropping Moment	Black Swan	Nominated
MTV Movie Awards	June 5, 2011	Best Kiss	Natalie Portman and Mila Kunis	Nominated
MTV Movie Awards	June 5, 2011	Best Movie	Black Swan	Nominated
National Movie Awards	May 11, 2011	Best Drama	Black Swan	Nominated
National Movie Awards	May 11, 2011	Performance of the Year	Natalie Portman	Nominated
New York Film Critics Circle	December 12, 2010	Best Cinematography	Matthew Libatique	Won
New York Film Critics Online	December 12, 2010	Best Actress	Natalie Portman	Won
New York Film Critics Online	December 12, 2010	Best Cinematography	Matthew Libatique	Won
New York Film Critics Online	December 12, 2010	Best Film Music or Score	Clint Mansell	Won
North Texas Film Critics Association	January 10, 2011	Best Actress	Natalie Portman	Won
Oklahoma Film Critics Circle	December 22, 2010	Best Actress	Natalie Portman	Won
Oklahoma Film Critics Circle	December 22, 2010	Best Film	Black Swan	Nominated
Oklahoma Film Critics Circle	December 22, 2010	Best Supporting Actress	Mila Kunis	Won
Online Film Critics Society	January 3, 2011	Best Actress	Natalie Portman	Won
Online Film Critics Society	January 3, 2011	Best Cinematography	Matthew Libatique	Nominated
Online Film Critics Society	January 3, 2011	Best Director	Darren Aronofsky	Nominated
Online Film Critics Society	January 3, 2011	Best Editing	Andrew Weisblum	Nominated
Online Film Critics Society	January 3, 2011	Best Film	Black Swan	Nominated
Online Film Critics Society	January 3, 2011	Best Original Screenplay	Mark Heyman, Andres Heinz and John McLaughlin	Nominated
Online Film Critics Society	January 3, 2011	Best Supporting Actress	Mila Kunis	Nominated
Phoenix Film Critics Society	December 28, 2010	Best Actress	Natalie Portman	Won
Phoenix Film Critics Society	December 28, 2010	Best Editing	Andrew Weisblum	Nominated
Phoenix Film Critics Society	December 28, 2010	Best Original Screenplay	Mark Heyman, Andres Heinz and John McLaughlin	Nominated
Producers Guild of America	January 22, 2011	Theatrical Picture	Black Swan	Nominated
San Diego Film Critics Society	December 14, 2010	Best Actress	Natalie Portman	Nominated
San Diego Film Critics Society	December 14, 2010	Best Cinematography	Matthew Libatique	Nominated
San Diego Film Critics Society	December 14, 2010	Best Director	Darren Aronofsky	Won
San Diego Film Critics Society	December 14, 2010	Best Editing	Andrew Weisblum	Nominated
San Diego Film Critics Society	December 14, 2010	Best Film	Black Swan	Nominated
San Diego Film Critics Society	December 14, 2010	Best Original Score	Clint Mansell	Nominated
San Diego Film Critics Society	December 14, 2010	Best Production Design	Therese De Prez	Nominated
San Francisco Film Critics Circle Awards	December 13, 2010	Best Cinematography	Matthew Libatique	Won
San Francisco Film Critics Circle Awards	December 13, 2010	Best Director	Darren Aronofsky	Won
Saturn Awards	June 23, 2011	Best Actress	Natalie Portman	Won
Saturn Awards	June 23, 2011	Best Director	Darren Aronofsky	Nominated
Saturn Awards	June 23, 2011	Best Horror/Thriller Film	Black Swan	Nominated
Saturn Awards	June 23, 2011	Best Supporting Actress	Mila Kunis	Won
Saturn Awards	June 23, 2011	Best Writing	Mark Heyman, Andres Heinz and John McLaughlin	Nominated
Satellite Awards	December 19, 2010	Best Actress — Drama	Natalie Portman	Nominated
Satellite Awards	December 19, 2010	Best Art Direction & Production Design	David Stein and Thérèse DePrez	Nominated
Satellite Awards	December 19, 2010	Best Costume Design	Amy Westcott	Nominated
Satellite Awards	December 19, 2010	Best Director	Darren Aronofsky	Nominated
Satellite Awards	December 19, 2010	Best Original Score	Clint Mansell	Nominated
Scream Awards	October 15, 2011	Ultimate Scream	Black Swan	Nominated
Scream Awards	October 15, 2011	Best Fantasy Movie	Black Swan	Nominated
Scream Awards	October 15, 2011	Best Director	Darren Aronofsky	Won
Scream Awards	October 15, 2011	Best Scream-Play	Black Swan	Nominated
Scream Awards	October 15, 2011	Best Fantasy Actress	Natalie Portman	Won
Scream Awards	October 15, 2011	Best Supporting Actress	Mila Kunis	Won
Scream Awards	October 15, 2011	Most Memorable Mutilation	Transformed Into Swan	Nominated
Screen Actors Guild	January 30, 2011	Best Performance by a Cast in a Motion Picture	Vincent Cassel, Barbara Hershey, Mila Kunis, Natalie Portman and Winona Ryder	Nominated
Screen Actors Guild	January 30, 2011	Best Performance by a Female Actor in a Leading Role	Natalie Portman	Won
Screen Actors Guild	January 30, 2011	Best Performance by a Female Actor in a Supporting Role	Mila Kunis	Nominated
Southeastern Film Critics Association	December 13, 2010	Best Actress	Natalie Portman	Won
St. Louis Film Critics Association	December 20, 2010	Best Actress	Natalie Portman	Won
St. Louis Film Critics Association	December 20, 2010	Best Director	Darren Aronofsky	Nominated
St. Louis Film Critics Association	December 20, 2010	Best Film	Black Swan	Nominated
St. Louis Film Critics Association	December 20, 2010	Best Score	Clint Mansell	Nominated
St. Louis Film Critics Association	December 20, 2010	Best Original Screenplay	Mark Heyman, Andres Heinz and John McLaughlin	Nominated
St. Louis Film Critics Association	December 20, 2010	Best Supporting Actress	Barbara Hershey	Nominated
Teen Choice Awards	August 7, 2011	Choice Movie Actress: Drama	Natalie Portman	Won
Teen Choice Awards	August 7, 2011	Choice Movie: Drama	Black Swan	Won
Teen Choice Awards	August 7, 2011	Choice Movie: Female Scene Stealer	Mila Kunis	Nominated
Teen Choice Awards	August 7, 2011	Choice Movie: Liplock	Natalie Portman and Mila Kunis	Nominated
Toronto Film Critics Association	December 14, 2010	Best Actress	Natalie Portman	Nominated
Toronto Film Critics Association	December 14, 2010	Best Director	Darren Aronofsky	Nominated
Toronto Film Critics Association	December 14, 2010	Best Film	Black Swan	Nominated
Utah Film Critics Association	December 23, 2010	Best Actress	Natalie Portman	Won
Utah Film Critics Association	December 23, 2010	Best Cinematography	Matthew Libatique	Nominated
Utah Film Critics Association	December 23, 2010	Best Supporting Actress	Mila Kunis	Nominated
Vancouver Film Critics Circle	January 10, 2011	Best Actress	Natalie Portman	Nominated
Vancouver Film Critics Circle	January 10, 2011	Best Director	Darren Aronofsky	Nominated
Vancouver Film Critics Circle	January 10, 2011	Best Film	Black Swan	Nominated
Venice Film Festival	September 11, 2010	Best Film Golden Lion	Black Swan	Nominated
Venice Film Festival	September 11, 2010	Emerging Performer	Mila Kunis	Won
Visual Effects Society	February 1, 2011	Outstanding Supporting Visual Effects in a Feature Motion Picture	Dan Schrecker, Colleen Bachman, Michael Capton and Brad Kalinoski	Nominated
Washington D.C. Area Film Critics Association	December 6, 2010	Best Actress	Natalie Portman	Nominated
Washington D.C. Area Film Critics Association	December 6, 2010	Best Art Direction	Therese DePrez and Tora Peterson	Nominated
Washington D.C. Area Film Critics Association	December 6, 2010	Best Cinematography	Matthew Libatique	Nominated
Washington D.C. Area Film Critics Association	December 6, 2010	Best Director	Darren Aronofsky	Nominated
Washington D.C. Area Film Critics Association	December 6, 2010	Best Film	Black Swan	Nominated
Washington D.C. Area Film Critics Association	December 6, 2010	Best Original Screenplay	Mark Heyman, Andres Heinz and John McLaughlin	Nominated
Washington D.C. Area Film Critics Association	December 6, 2010	Best Score	Clint Mansell	Nominated
Writers Guild of America	February 5, 2011	Best Original Screenplay	Mark Heyman, Andres Heinz and John McLaughlin	Nominated

^{^[I]} Each year is linked to the article about the awards held that year.

== See also ==
- 2010 in film
