= Edgeline Films =

American film producer

- Industry: Film industry
- Founded: November 2016; 9 years ago
- Founder: Josh Kriegman; Elyse Steinberg; Eli Despres
- Headquarters: Brooklyn, New York City
- Website: edgelinefilms.com

Edgeline Films is an American film production and television production company founded in 2016 by Joshua Kriegman, Elyse Steinberg, and Eli Despres. The company primarily produces documentary films and television series.

They have produced such films as Weiner (2016),The Fight (2020) and Spermworld (2024), and the television series Couples Therapy (2019–present) and Jerrod Carmichael Reality Show (2024).

== History ==
Edgeline Films was formed after the release of the film, Weiner (2016), directed by Josh Kriegman and Elyse Steinberg, which follows Anthony Weiner's campaign for Mayor of New York City during the 2013 mayoral election. The film was shortlisted for an Academy Award for Best Documentary Feature at the 89th Academy Awards, but ultimately was not nominated. The company has also produced The Fight (2020), directed by Kriegman, Steinberg, and Eli Despres, which documents legal battles that lawyers for the American Civil Liberties Union (ACLU) had faced during the Trump administration. The company also co-produced Spermworld (2024), directed by Lance Oppenheim, inspired by Nellie Bowles' article "The Sperm Kings Have a Problem: Too Much Demand" with The New York Times.

The company has also produced multiple documentary series, including Couples Therapy (2019–present), featuring psychologist and psychoanalyst Dr. Orna Guralnik, and Jerrod Carmichael Reality Show (2024), directed by Ari Katcher.

== Productions ==
=== Feature films ===
| Release date | Title | Notes | Reference |
|---|---|---|---|
| May 20, 2016 | Weiner | Critics' Choice Documentary Award for Best First Documentary Feature Sundance Film Festival Grand Jury Prize: U.S. Documentary Nominated — American Cinema Editors Award for Best Edited Documentary – Feature Nominated — Austin Film Critics Association Award for Best Documentary Film Nominated — BAFTA Award for Best Documentary Nominated — Chicago Film Critics Association Award for Best Documentary Nominated — Critics' Choice Documentary Award for Best Documentary Feature Nominated — Critics' Choice Documentary Award for Best Political Documentary Nominated — Dallas–Fort Worth Film Critics Association Award for Best Documentary Film Nominated — Detroit Film Critics Society Award for Best Documentary Nominated — Directors Guild of America Award for Outstanding Directing – Documentaries Nominated — Florida Film Critics Circle Award for Best Documentary Film Nominated — Gotham Independent Film Audience Award Nominated — Gotham Independent Film Award for Best Documentary Nominated — Online Film Critics Society Award for Best Documentary Film Nominated — St. Louis Film Critics Association Award for Best Documentary Feature Nominated — TCA Award for Outstanding Achievement in News and Information | |
| July 31, 2020 | The Fight | Sundance Film Festival Special Jury Award for Social Impact Filmmaking: US Documentary Nominated — Sundance Film Festival Grand Jury Prize: U.S. Documentary Nominated — Critics' Choice Documentary Award for Best Documentary Feature | |
| March 29, 2024 | Spermworld | | |

=== Television ===
| Release date | Title | Notes | Reference |
|---|---|---|---|
| September 6, 2019 | Couples Therapy | American Cinema Editors Award for Best Edited Non-Scripted Series (2023) TCA Award for Outstanding Achievement in Reality Programming (2021) Nominated — TCA Award for Outstanding Achievement in Reality Programming (2023) | |
| March 29, 2024 | Jerrod Carmichael Reality Show | Gotham Independent Film Award for Breakthrough Nonfiction Series (2024) Nominated — TCA Award for Outstanding Achievement in Reality Programming (2024) | |
