= Sperminator =

Sperminator may refer to:

- Cecil Jacobson, an American former fertility doctor who used his own sperm to impregnate his patients without informing them.
- Ari Nagel, an American maths professor and sperm donor.
