= Nothing, Except Everything =

American short film by Wesley Wang

- Directed by: Wesley Wang
- Written by: Wesley Wang
- Produced by: Scott Aharoni
- Starring: David Mazouz; Lily Chee
- Cinematography: Stefan Nachmann
- Edited by: John Rafanelli
- Music by: Tim Fain
- Release date: April 21, 2023 (Jim Thorpe Independent Film Festival)
- Running time: 13 minutes
- Country: United States
- Language: English

Nothing, Except Everything is an American coming-of-age short film written and directed by Wesley Wang and produced by Scott Aharoni. It stars David Mazouz as Miles, a high school senior attempting to find order in the uncertainty surrounding graduation, and Lily Chee as Harper. The title is stylized in lowercase.

The film received the High School Film Competition Summer White Lynch Memorial Grand Prize at the 2023 Indy Shorts International Film Festival. The film was later released on YouTube, where it received millions of views.

In April 2024, Deadline Hollywood reported that TriStar Pictures had acquired the rights to develop a feature-length adaptation, with Wang attached to write and direct and Darren Aronofsky's Protozoa Pictures producing. As of 2026, the feature is no longer being created with Sony's involvement.

== Plot ==
Miles is a high school senior nearing graduation. While facing uncertainty about college, friendships and his relationship with Harper, he becomes preoccupied with the number seven and why so many people select it when asked to choose a number between one and ten.

Miles begins treating the number's recurrence as possible evidence that an underlying order exists in the world. His search for certainty is intercut with memories of childhood, his family, Harper and his late uncle Fred.

As graduation approaches, Miles asks other students what they believe gives life meaning. After hearing their answers and reflecting on his relationships, he begins to accept that uncertainty is an unavoidable part of his future.

== Cast ==
- David Mazouz as Miles
- Lily Chee as Harper
- Eli D. Goss as young Miles
- Jolie Curtsinger as Miles' mother
- Mark Quiles as Miles' father
- Lia Mountis as Miles' sister
- Tom Moynahan as Uncle Fred
- Roger Rathburn as the calculus teacher

== Production ==
Wang wrote and directed the film during his final year of high school. He said that he wanted to make a film about young people from the perspective of a young filmmaker. The story was also influenced by the lack of fulfillment he experienced after being admitted to Harvard University, which led him to explore uncertainty, existentialism and how members of Generation Z search for meaning.

Wang contacted approximately 200 prospective producers before partnering with Scott Aharoni. According to Wang, Aharoni subsequently helped recruit Mazouz and Chee. The production involved more than a dozen cast members and a crew of over 30 people.

Stefan Nachmann served as cinematographer, John Rafanelli edited the film and Tim Fain composed its music. Wang described its montage-driven visual approach as an attempt to combine conventional filmmaking with stylistic elements associated with short-form content on platforms such as TikTok and Instagram.

== Release ==
The film screened at the Jim Thorpe Independent Film Festival on April 21, 2023. It subsequently appeared in the High School Film Competition at the 2023 Indy Shorts International Film Festival. It received the competition's Summer White Lynch Memorial Grand Prize, which included a $2,500 cash award.

The film was also named Best Overall Film at the 2023 All American High School Film Festival. It later screened at the 2024 Cleveland International Film Festival.

The film was released publicly on Wang's YouTube channel on September 29, 2023. By May 2024, it had received more than 4.4 million views.

== Reception ==
Writing for MovieMaker, Tim Molloy praised the film's pacing, cinematography, narration and use of humor alongside its existential themes.

In his coverage of the 2023 Indy Shorts festival for RogerEbert.com, Matt Fagerholm praised the film's creativity and its depiction of the existential anxieties faced by recent high school graduates. He highlighted a date scene assembled from fragmented pieces of dialogue.

Kaylin Han of the University of Rochester's Campus Times praised the film's portrayal of high school experiences but wrote that its short running time left some relationships and ideas underdeveloped. Han also argued that the number of themes sometimes competed with the film's montage-driven visual style.

== Feature adaptation ==
In April 2024, Deadline Hollywood reported that TriStar Pictures had acquired the film rights following a competitive bidding process. Wang was attached to write and direct a feature-length adaptation, with Darren Aronofsky's Protozoa Pictures producing. The proposed adaptation was described as a romantic science-fiction thriller expanding on the short film's premise. In August 2026, Wesley Wang separated with Sony Pictures, and the feature film adaptation is no longer going forward with Sony's involvement.
