= David Bolen (cinematographer) =

Canadian cinematographer

- Born: Canada
- Occupation: Cinematographer
- Years active: 2011–present
- Website: davidbolen.com

David Bolen is a cinematographer based out of Los Angeles, California. He is best known for his work on feature films, television and documentaries.

== Career ==
Bolen graduated from the University of Southern California film school in 2013. He is a member of the International Cinematographers Guild (IATSE Local 600). He has worked on music videos for Camila Cabello, Lil Nas X, Kendrick Lamar and more.

Bolen is best known for his work on Netflix's Delhi Crime, Untold, Trial by Media and Disney+'s Marvel's 616.

== Selected filmography ==
=== Film ===
Year	Title	Director	Notes	Ref.
2018	Soni	Ivan Ayr		
2019	1BR	David Marmor		
2022	Gone in the Night	Eli Horowitz		
2024	Thelma	Josh Margolin		
2026	Primetime	Lance Oppenheim		
2026	You Can See Everything	Lance Oppenheim Nathan Fielder		

=== Television ===
- 2023 – Live to 100: Secrets of the Blue Zones
- 2022 – Delhi Crime (5 episodes)
- 2022 – The Deep End (4 episodes)
- 2021 – Untold: Deal with the Devil
- 2021 – Untold: Caitlyn Jenner
- 2020 – Trial by Media (1 episode)
- 2020 – The Con (1 episode)
- 2020 – Marvel's 616 (3 episodes)
- 2019-2020 – I Was A Teenage Felon (7 episodes)
- 2019 – Deadly Cults (3 episodes)
- 2015 – Haven: Origins

=== Documentary film ===
Year	Title	Director	Notes	Ref.
2015	The Drop Box	Brian Ivie		
2018	When Lambs Become Lions	Jon Kasbe		
2018	A Concerto Is a Conversation	Ben Proudfoot and Kris Bowers	Short film	
2020	Some Kind of Heaven	Lance Oppenheim		
2021	A Spark Story	Jason Sterman and Leanne Dare		
2023	The Lionheart	Laura Brownson		
2023	The Ringleader: The Case of the Bling Ring	Erin Lee Carr		
2024	Spermworld	Lance Oppenheim		
2025	The Python Hunt	Xander Robin		
2026	You Can See Everything	Lance Oppenheim and Nathan Fielder		

=== Music video ===
- 2024 – Wallows : "Your Apartment"
- 2023 – Dominic Fike : "Dancing in the Courthouse"
- 2022 – Camila Cabello : "Bam Bam"
- 2021 – Alessia Cara : "Sweet Dream"
- 2021 – Alessia Cara : "Shapeshifter"
- 2021 – Lil Nas X : "Sun Goes Down"
- 2019 – Galantis & Yellow Claw : "We Can Get High"
- 2019 – Next Town Down : "Wonderin"
- 2019 – Next Town Down : "Easy feat. 6lack"
- 2019 – Doja Cat : "Rules"
- 2018 – Lauren Jauregui : "Expectations"
- 2018 – Wallows : "1980s Horror Film"
- 2018 – Jay Rock : "Es Tales"
- 2015 – Jay Rock : "Money Trees Deuce"
- 2015 – Kendrick Lamar : "For Free? (Interlude)"
- 2015 – Jay Rock Feat. Black Hippy : "Vice City"
- 2015 – Jay Rock : "The Ways"

== Awards and nominations ==
Year	Result	Award	Category	Work	Ref.
2027	Pending	20th Cinema Eye Honors	Outstanding Achievement in Cinematography	You Can See Everything	
2026	Won	Critics Choice Documentary Awards	Best Cinematography	You Can See Everything	
2024	Nominated	Daytime Emmy Awards	Outstanding Cinematography	Live to 100: Secrets of the Blue Zones	
2022	Nominated	MTV Video Music Awards	Best Cinematography	"Bam Bam"	
2021	Won	Webby Awards	Video - Documentary	Blood Rider	
2020	Nominated	Camerimage	Documentary shorts Competition	Blood Rider	
