= Darren Aronofsky =

American filmmaker (born 1969)

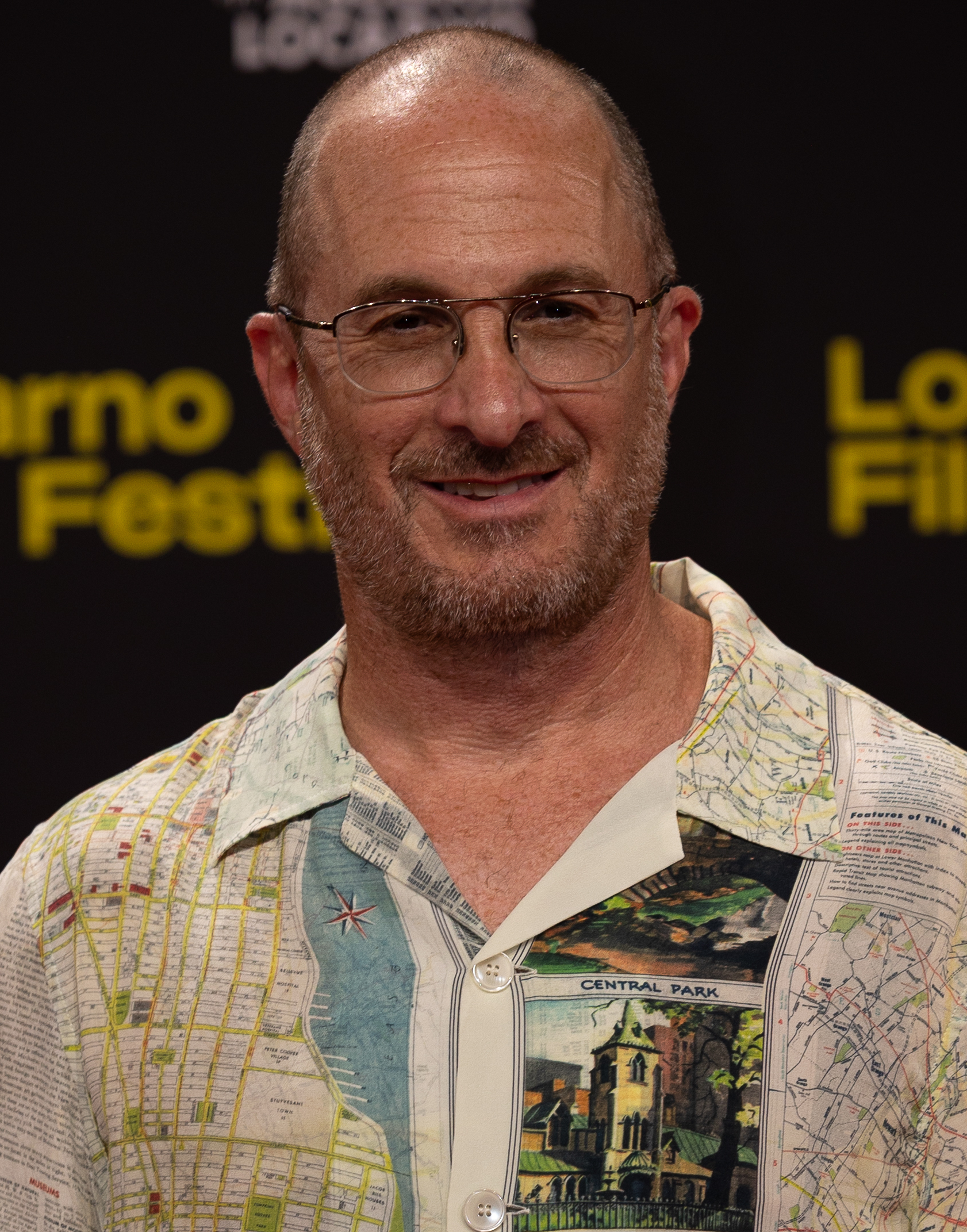
- Aronofsky in 2026
- Born: February 12, 1969 (age 57); New York City, U.S.
- Citizenship: United States; Poland (from 2024)
- Education: Harvard University (BA); American Film Institute (MFA)
- Occupations: Film director; screenwriter; producer
- Years active: 1997–present
- Partner: Rachel Weisz (2001–2010)
- Children: 1

Darren Aronofsky (born February 12, 1969) is an American filmmaker. His films are noted for their surreal, dramatic, and often disturbing elements, frequently in the form of psychological realism. His accolades include a Golden Lion and a Primetime Emmy Award as well as nominations for an Academy Award, a Golden Globe Award and the British Academy Film Award. Aronofsky studied film and social anthropology at Harvard University before studying directing at the AFI Conservatory. He won several film awards after completing his senior thesis film, Supermarket Sweep, which became a National Student Academy Award finalist. In 1997, he founded the film and TV production company Protozoa Pictures. His feature film debut, the surrealist psychological thriller Pi (1998), earned him the award for Best Director at the Sundance Film Festival and an Independent Spirit Award for Best First Screenplay.

Aronofsky then directed the psychological drama Requiem for a Dream (2000), the romantic fantasy sci-fi drama The Fountain (2006), and the sports drama The Wrestler (2008), the latter of which earned the Golden Lion at the Venice Film Festival. For his critically acclaimed psychological horror Black Swan (2010), he was nominated for Best Director at the Academy Awards, British Academy Film Awards and Golden Globe Awards. He earned acclaim and controversy for his next films, the Biblical epic Noah (2014), the psychological horror film Mother! (2017) and the psychological drama The Whale (2022). He then directed the dark comedy crime film Caught Stealing (2025).

== Early life and education ==
Aronofsky was born in the Brooklyn borough of New York, United States, on February 12, 1969, the son of teachers Charlotte and Abraham Aronofsky, both of Polish-Jewish descent. He grew up in Brooklyn's Manhattan Beach neighborhood. He said he was "raised culturally Jewish, but there was very little spiritual attendance in the temple. It was a cultural thing—celebrating the holidays, knowing where you came from, knowing your history, having respect for what your people have been through." He graduated from Edward R. Murrow High School. He has one sister, Patti, who attended a professional ballet school through high school. His parents would often take him to Broadway performances, which sparked his interest in show business.

During his youth, Aronofsky trained as a field biologist with The School for Field Studies in Kenya in 1985 and Alaska in 1986. He attended school in Kenya to pursue an interest in learning about ungulates. He later said that the School for Field Studies "changed the way [he] perceived the world". Aronofsky's interest in the outdoors led him to backpack his way through Europe and the Middle East. At the age of 18, he entered Harvard University, where he majored in social anthropology and studied filmmaking; he graduated in 1991. He became seriously interested in film while attending Harvard after befriending Dan Schrecker, an aspiring animator, and Sean Gullette, who would go on to star in Aronofsky's first film, Pi. His cinematic influences included Akira Kurosawa, Roman Polanski, Federico Fellini, Terry Gilliam, Shinya Tsukamoto, Hubert Selby Jr. Spike Lee, Satoshi Kon, and Jim Jarmusch.

Aronofsky's senior thesis film, Supermarket Sweep, was a finalist in the 1991 Student Academy Awards. In 1992, Aronofsky received his MFA degree in directing from the AFI Conservatory, where his classmates included Todd Field, Doug Ellin, Scott Silver, and Mark Waters. He won the institute's Franklin J. Schaffner Alumni Medal.

== Career ==
=== 1997–2006: Directorial debut and early films ===
Aronofsky's debut feature, titled Pi—sometimes stylized as π—was shot in October 1997. The film was financed in part from $100 donations from his friends and family. In return, he promised to pay each back $150 if the film made money, and they would at least get screen credit if the film lost money. Producing the film with an initial budget of $60,000, Aronofsky premiered Pi at the 1998 Sundance Film Festival, where he won the Best Director award. The film itself was nominated for a special Jury Award. Artisan Entertainment got a bag of money and bought distribution rights for $1 million. The film was released to the public later that year to critical acclaim and it grossed a total of $3,221,152 at the box-office. Pi was the first film to be made available for download on the Internet.

Aronofsky followed his debut with Requiem for a Dream, a film based on Hubert Selby Jr.'s novel of the same name. He was paid $50,000, and worked for three years with nearly the same production team as his previous film. Following the financial breakout of Pi, he was capable of hiring established actors, including Ellen Burstyn and Jared Leto, and received a budget of $3,500,000 to produce the film. Production of the film occurred over the period of one year, with the film being released in October 2000. The film went on to gross $7,390,108 worldwide. Aronofsky received acclaim for his stylish direction, and was nominated for another Independent Spirit Award, this time for Best Director. The film itself was nominated for five awards in total, winning two, for Best Actress and Cinematography. Clint Mansell's soundtrack for the film was also well-regarded, and since their first collaboration in 1996, Mansell has composed the music to every Aronofsky film (except for Mother!, 2017 and The Whale, 2022). Ellen Burstyn was nominated for numerous awards, including for an Academy Award for Best Actress, and won the Independent Spirit Award. Aronofsky was awarded the PRISM Award from the Robert Wood Johnson Foundation with the National Institute on Drug Abuse for the film's depiction of drug abuse.

In May 2000, Aronofsky was briefly attached to make an adaptation of David Wiesner's 1999 children's book Sector 7 for Nickelodeon Movies; as of 2025, the project remains unmade. In mid-2000, Warner Bros. hired Aronofsky to write and direct Batman: Year One, which was to be the fifth film in the Batman franchise. Aronofsky, who collaborated with Frank Miller on an unproduced script for Ronin, brought Miller in to co-write Year One with him, intending to reboot the series. "It's somewhat based on the comic book", Aronofsky later said. "Toss out everything you can imagine about Batman! Everything! We're starting completely anew", who intended to re-imagine the titular character in a darker, adult-oriented and grounded style, with his adaptation aiming for an R-rating. Regular Aronofsky collaborator Matthew Libatique was set as cinematographer, and Aronofsky had also approached Christian Bale for the role of Batman. Bale was ultimately cast in the role for Batman Begins. After that project failed to develop, Aronofsky declined the opportunity to direct a film in the Batman franchise. In March 2001, he helped write the screenplay to the horror film Below, which he also produced.

In April 2001, Aronofsky entered negotiations with Warner Bros. and Village Roadshow to direct a then-untitled science fiction film, with Brad Pitt in the lead role. In June 2001, actress Cate Blanchett entered talks to join the film, which Aronofsky, wanting the title to remain secret, had given the working title of The Last Man. Production was postponed to wait for a pregnant Blanchett to give birth to her child in December 2001. Production was ultimately set for late October 2002 in Queensland and Sydney.

By now officially titled The Fountain, the film had a budget of $70 million, co-financed by Warner Bros. and New Regency, which had filled the gap after Village Roadshow withdrew. Pitt left the project seven weeks before the first day of shooting, halting production. In February 2004, Warner Bros. resurrected it on a $35 million budget with Hugh Jackman in the lead role. In August, actress Rachel Weisz filled the vacancy left by Blanchett. The Fountain was released on November 22, 2006, a day before the American Thanksgiving holiday; ultimately it grossed $15,978,422 in theaters worldwide. Audiences and critics were divided in their responses to it.

=== 2007–2010: Breakthrough and acclaim ===
Aronofsky, Mickey Rourke, and Evan Rachel Wood discussing The Wrestler (2008)

In 2007, Aronofsky hired writer Scott Silver to develop The Fighter with him. Aronofsky approached Bale to star in the film, but Aronofsky dropped out because of its similarities to The Wrestler and to work on MGM's RoboCop remake. In July 2010, Aronofsky had left the project due to uncertainty over the financially distressed studio's future. When asked about the film, he said, "I think I'm still attached. I don't know. I haven't heard from anyone in a while". Later during 2007, Aronofsky said he was planning to film a movie about Noah's Ark.

Aronofsky had the idea for The Wrestler for over a decade. He hired Robert Siegel to turn his idea into a script. The actor Nicolas Cage entered negotiations in October 2007 to star as Randy, the film's protagonist. The following month Cage left the project, and Mickey Rourke replaced him in the lead role. Aronofsky said that Cage pulled out of the movie because Aronofsky wanted Rourke to star; Aronofsky said, stating that Cage was "a complete gentleman, and he understood that my heart was with Mickey and he stepped aside. I have so much respect for Nic Cage as an actor and I think it really could have worked with Nic but, you know, Nic was incredibly supportive of Mickey and he is old friends with Mickey and really wanted to help with this opportunity, so he pulled himself out of the race." Cage responded, "I wasn't quote 'dropped' from the movie. I resigned from the movie because I didn't think I had enough time to achieve the look of the wrestler who was on steroids, which I would never do". The roughly 40-day shoot began in January 2008.

The Wrestler premiered at the 65th Venice International Film Festival. Initially receiving little attention, the film wound up winning the Golden Lion, the highest award at the world's oldest film festival. The Wrestler received critical acclaim, and both Rourke and co-star Marisa Tomei received Academy Award, Golden Globe, SAG, and BAFTA nominations for their performances. Rourke won a Golden Globe, as did Bruce Springsteen for his original song written for the film. The Wrestler grossed $44,674,354 worldwide on a budget of $6,000,000 making it Aronofsky's highest-grossing film to that point.

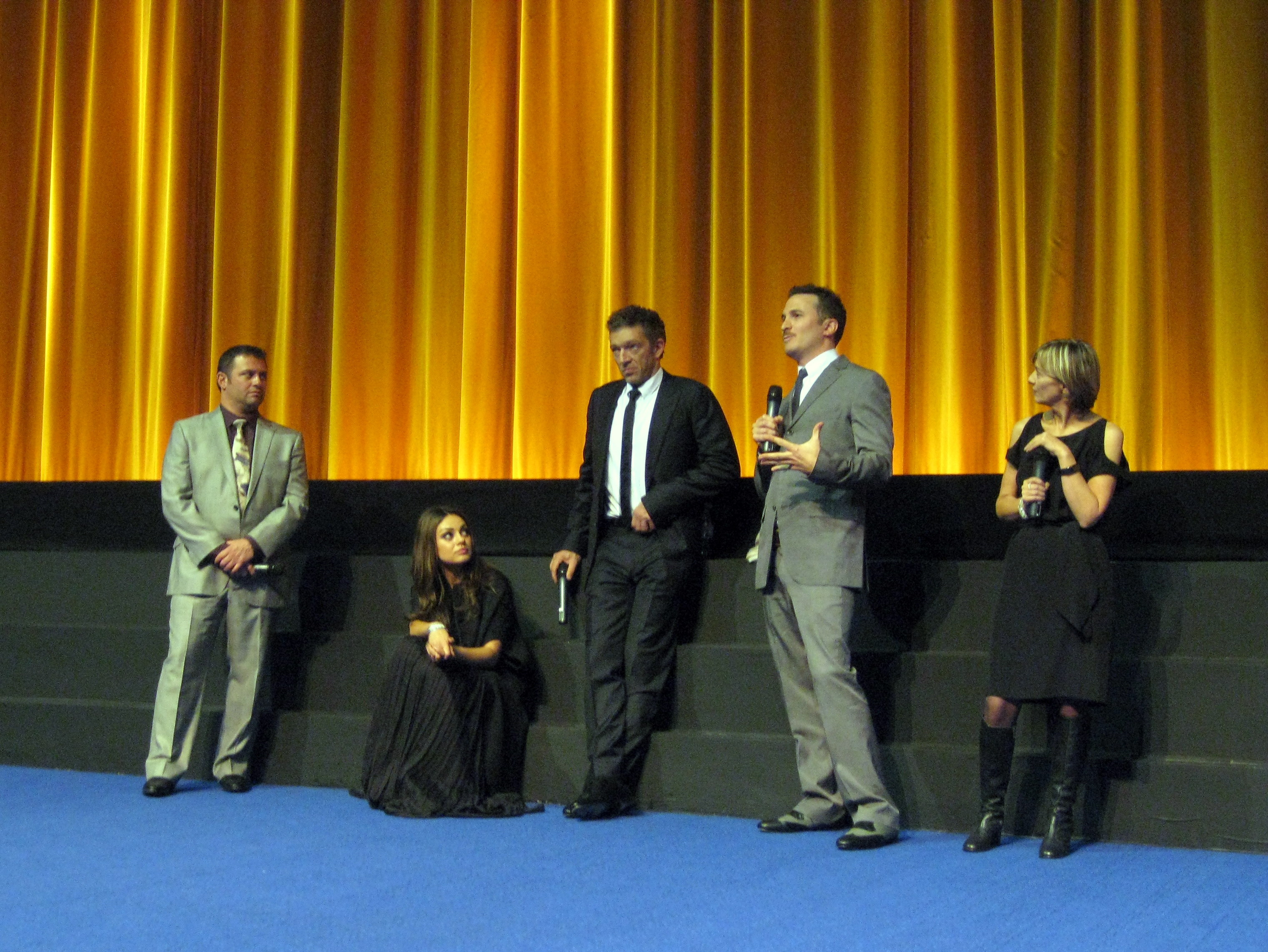
Aronofsky with the cast and crew of Black Swan (2010)

Aronofsky's next film was Black Swan, which had been in development since 2001, a psychological thriller horror film about a New York City ballerina. The film starred actress Natalie Portman, whom Aronofsky had known since 2000. She introduced Aronofsky to Mila Kunis, who joined the cast in 2009. Black Swan had its world premiere as the opening film at the 67th Venice Film Festival in September 2010. It received a standing ovation whose length Variety said made it "one of the strongest Venice openers in recent memory".

Black Swan has received high praise from film critics, and received a record 12 Broadcast Film Critics Association nominations, four Independent Spirit Award nominations, four Golden Globe nominations, three SAG nominations, and many more accolades. Aronofsky received a Golden Globe nomination for Best Director. The film broke limited-release box-office records and grossed an unexpectedly high $329,398,046. On January 25, 2011, the film was nominated for a total of five Academy Awards; Best Picture, Best Director, Best Actress, Best Cinematography and Best Film Editing. On February 27, 2011, Portman won for Best Actress. The film was awarded the PRISM Award from the Substance Abuse & Mental Health Services Administration for its depiction of mental health issues. Aronofsky served as an executive producer on The Fighter, which was also nominated for Best Picture at the Oscars and won two for Best Supporting Actor and Best Supporting Actress for Christian Bale and Melissa Leo.

=== 2011–2015: Larger-budget productions ===
Aronofsky was attached to The Wolverine, which was scheduled to begin production in March 2011, but he left the project due to scheduling issues. The film was set to be sixth entry of the X-Men film series, featuring a story revolving around Wolverine's adventures in Japan. In April 2011, Aronofsky was announced as the president of the jury for the 68th Venice International Film Festival.

In December 2011, Aronofsky directed the music video for Lou Reed and Metallica's "The View" from their album Lulu. Aronofsky was set to direct an HBO series pilot called Hobgoblin. Announced on June 16, 2011, the series would have depicted a group of magicians and con artists who use their powers of deception to defeat Hitler during World War II. He was set to work on the project with Pulitzer Prize winning author Michael Chabon and his wife Ayelet Waldman. In June 2013, it was announced that HBO had dropped the show and Aronofsky had pulled out, as well.

In 2011, Aronofsky tried to launch production on Noah, a retelling of the Bible story of Noah's Ark, projected for a $115 million budget. By the following year, the film had secured funding and distribution from New Regency and Paramount Pictures, with Russell Crowe hired for the title role. The film was adapted into a serialized graphic novel written by Aronofsky and Ari Handel, published in French in October 2011 by the Belgian publisher Le Lombard. By July 2012, Aronofsky's crews were building an ark set in Oyster Bay, New York. Aronofsky announced the start of filming on Noah on Twitter in the same month, tweeting shots of the filming in Iceland. The film featured Emma Watson, Anthony Hopkins, Logan Lerman, and Jennifer Connelly, with the latter having also starred in Requiem for a Dream. During its opening weekend, Noah held the largest non-sequel opening within Russia and Brazil, and the fourth-largest opening of all time. Aronofsky did not use live animals for the film, saying in a PETA video that "there's really no reason to do it anymore because the technology has arrived". The Humane Society of the United States gave him their inaugural Humane Filmmaker Award in honor of his use of computer-generated animals. That same year, he was announced as the president of the jury for the 65th Berlin International Film Festival for February 2015.

=== 2016–present: Return to Indie dramas ===
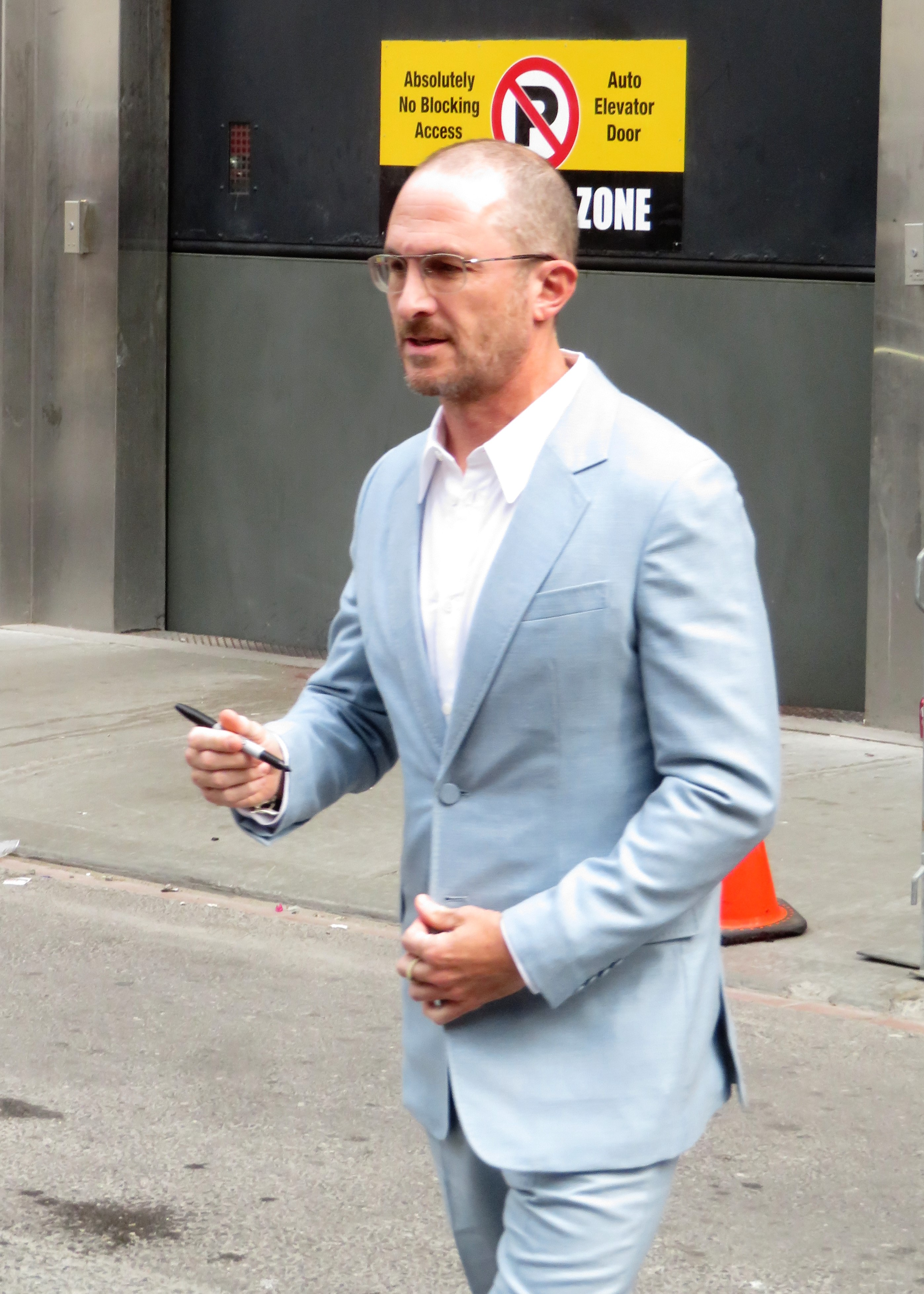
Aronofsky at the premiere of The Whale in 2022

In 2016, he produced the Pablo Larraín drama Jackie (2016). Aronofsky's next film, Mother!, was released by Paramount Pictures on September 15, 2017. It stars Jennifer Lawrence, Javier Bardem, Michelle Pfeiffer, Domhnall Gleeson, Ed Harris and Kristen Wiig. The film sparked controversy upon release for its depiction of violence, and, though it received generally positive reviews, it polarized audiences, becoming one of few films to receive a "F" CinemaScore grade. On review aggregator Rotten Tomatoes, the film has an approval rating of 68% based on 278 reviews, and an average rating of 6.8/10. The site's critical consensus reads, "There's no denying that Mother! is the thought-provoking product of a singularly ambitious artistic vision, though it may be too unwieldy for mainstream tastes."

In 2018, he was the co-executive producer of SPHERES, a virtual reality journey through the universe, that was acquired in a seven figure deal at the 2018 Sundance Film Festival.

In January 2021, his next film was announced to be The Whale, a film adaptation of Samuel D. Hunter's play of the same name, starring Brendan Fraser. The Whale had its world premiere at the 79th Venice International Film Festival on September 4, 2022, where it received a six-minute standing ovation. Fraser's performance was highly praised and won him the Academy Award for Best Actor. The film also won the Best Makeup and Hairstyling as well as a nomination for the Best Supporting Actress (Hong Chau) as well as four nominations for the 76th British Academy Film Awards. In 2023, Aronofsky directed the feature Postcard from Earth, which was produced and filmed exclusively for the Sphere in the Las Vegas Valley on its 16K resolution screen.

In 2024, it was announced that Aronofsky would direct the 1990s-set crime thriller Caught Stealing for Sony Pictures, with Charlie Huston adapting his own novel and Austin Butler attached to star. The film was theatrically released on August 29, 2025.

In April 2024, Deadline reported that Aronofsky would be producing a feature-length adaptation of the coming of age short film Nothing, Except Everything from director Wesley Wang.

== Nonfiction work ==
In 2018, Aronofsky executive produced the 10-part documentary series One Strange Rock for National Geographic. Episodes cover topics like the universe's origins, alien life, human intelligence, and themes of survival and destruction. Daniel Fienberg of The Hollywood Reporter describes One Strange Rock as "spectacular, delivering the same sort of bringing-science-to-life thrills for Earth as Cosmos did with the universe and Blue Planet and Planet Earth have done with myriad lifeforms."

Aronofsky executive produced another National Geographic docuseries showcasing the planet's wonders, Welcome to Earth. The six-episode program was released in December 2021.

In 2020, Aronofsky produced director Lance Oppenheim's debut feature documentary, Some Kind of Heaven. Set in The Villages retirement community in Florida, the film follows four residents who struggle to fit into the community's prepackaged paradise. In The A.V. Club, A.A. Dowd says Some Kind of Heaven "is surely one of the most gorgeously, strikingly shot documentaries in recent memory". The film premiered at the Sundance Film Festival before being released by Magnolia Pictures in 2021.

In 2022, Aronofsky produced director Alex Pritz's documentary The Territory, about the Indigenous Uru-Eu-Wau-Wau people's struggle against advancing deforestation in the Brazilian Amazon, caused by farmers and unauthorized settlers. The film had its world premiere at the 2022 Sundance Film Festival on January 22, 2022, and was released theatrically on August 19, 2022, by National Geographic to critical praise. Guy Lodge of Variety writes, "'The Territory' is handsome without resting unduly on the natural beauty of its imperiled landscape, though iridescent closeups of plant and insect activity make clear the larger circle of life at stake here." The film was awarded a 2022 Peabody Award and was shortlisted for an Academy Award in the Documentary Feature Film category.

In 2023, Aronfosky produced and directed Postcard from Earth, an inaugural show for the Las Vegas Sphere.

Aronofsky also created and executive produced Limitless for National Geographic, released in November 2022. The six-part series features Chris Hemsworth and delves into the science of longevity.

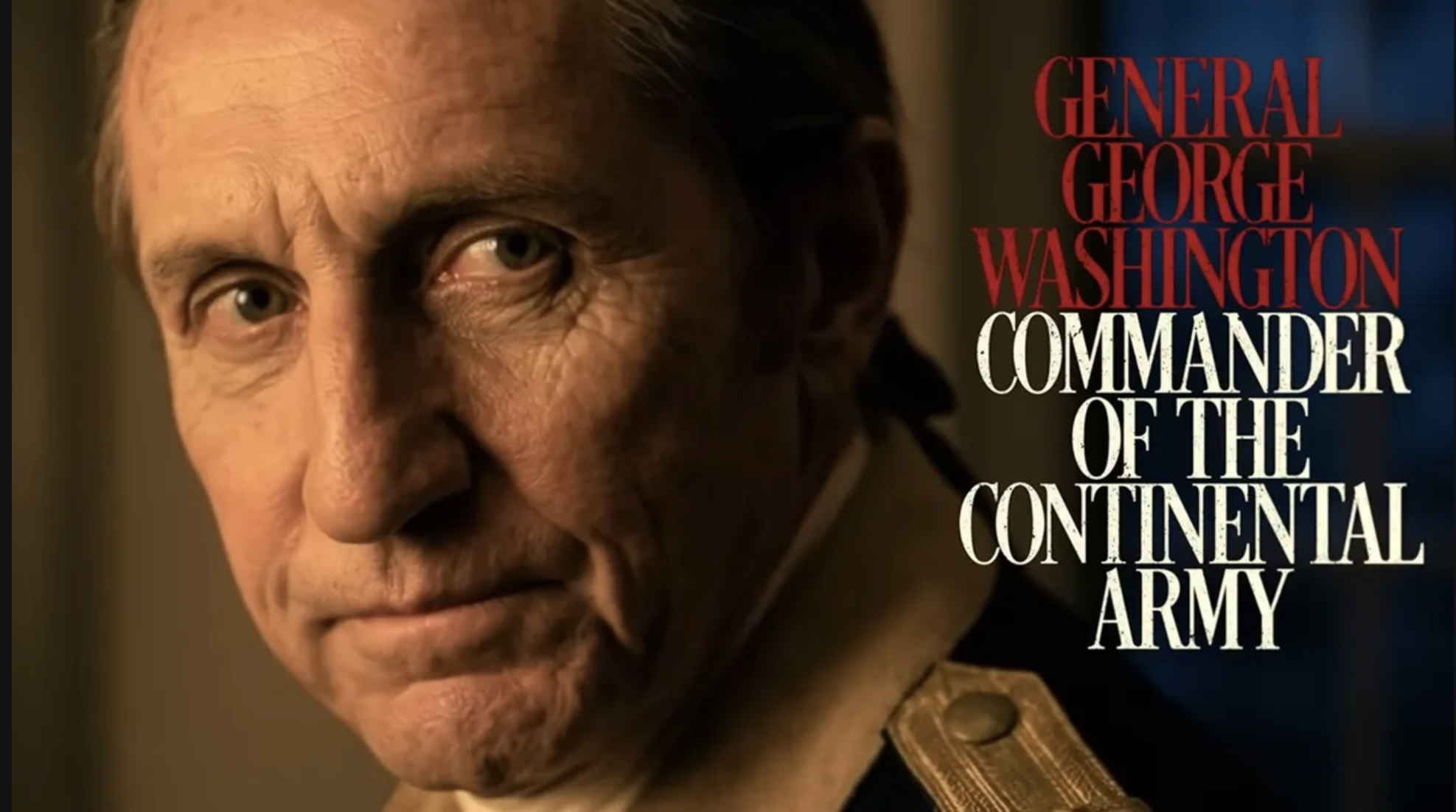
George Washington as depicted in On This Day… 1776

In 2026, Aronofsky announced the first project from his AI film studio Primordial Soup, titled On This Day... 1776. The webseries recreates moments from the American revolution by combining voice acting from unionized SAG-AFTRA actors with synthetic visuals produced with AI from Google DeepMind. The series is licensed by Time Studios and was released on YouTube on January 29, 2026. The series received overwhelmingly negative reception, with critics calling it AI slop. However, Deadline suggested the series may be "ahead of its time" and that Aronofsky could ultimately be remembered as a pioneer in AI-driven storytelling.

== Directing style ==
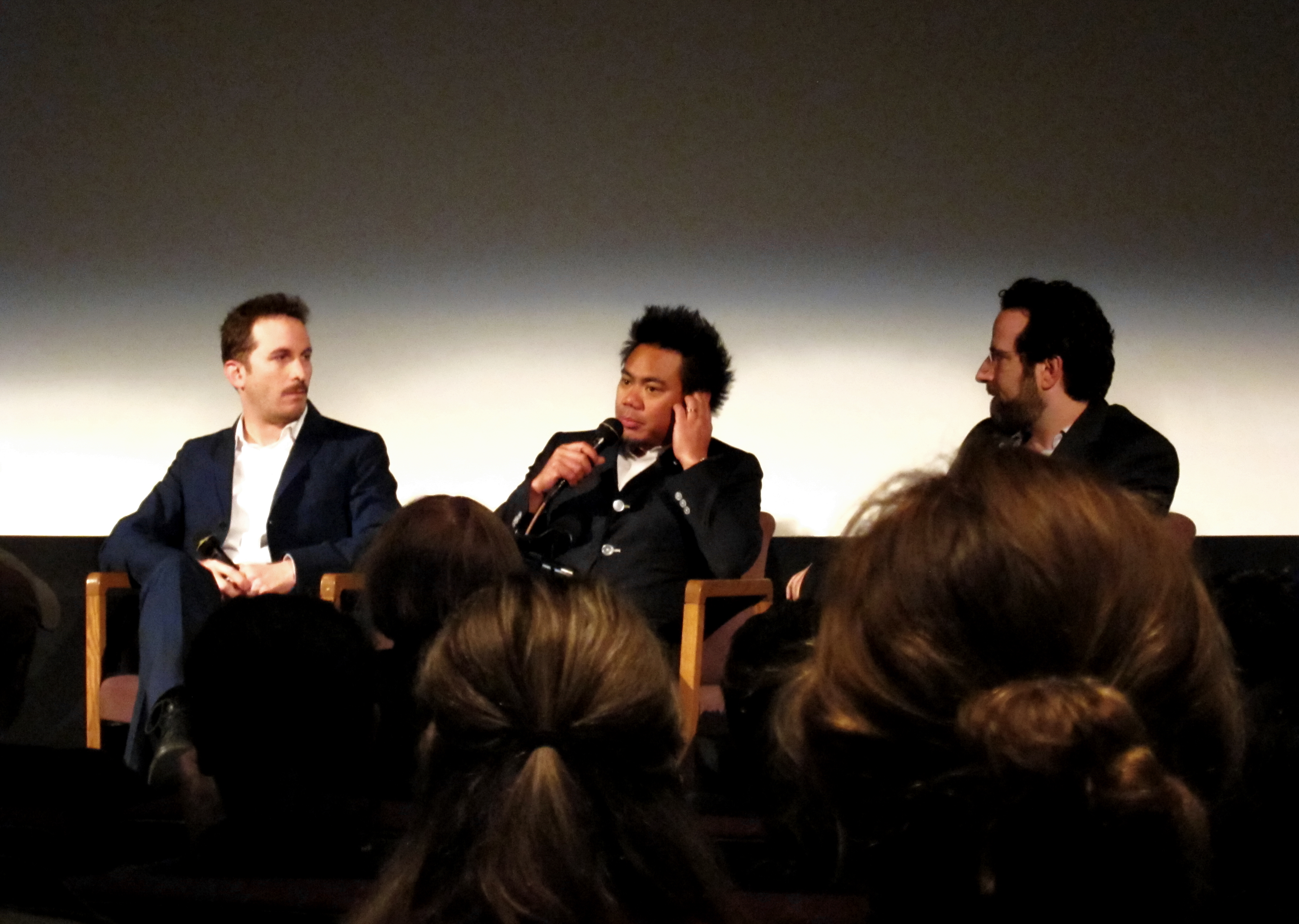
Aronofsky with frequent collaborators Matthew Libatique and Andrew Weisblum

Aronofsky's first two films, Pi and Requiem for a Dream, were low budget and used montages of extremely short shots, also known as hip hop montages. While an average 100-minute film has 600 to 700 cuts, Requiem for a Dream features more than 2,000. Split-screen is used extensively, along with extremely tight closeups. Long tracking shots, including those shot with an apparatus strapping a camera to an actor, called the Snorricam, and time-lapse photography are also prominent stylistic devices. Often with his films, Aronofsky alternates between extreme closeups and extreme wide shots to create a sense of isolation.

With The Fountain, Aronofsky restricted the use of computer-generated imagery. Henrik Fett, the visual effects supervisor of Look Effects, said, "Darren was quite clear on what he wanted and his intent to greatly minimize the use of computer graphics ... and I think the results are outstanding." Aronofsky filmed both The Wrestler and Black Swan with a muted palette and a grainy style. Part of this consistent style involves collaborations with frequent partners cinematographer Matthew Libatique, editor Andrew Weisblum and composer Clint Mansell. Mansell's music is often an important element of the films.

=== Themes and influences ===
Pi features several references to mathematics and mathematical theories. In a 1998 interview, Aronofsky acknowledged several influences for Pi: "I'm a big fan of Kurosawa and Fellini. In this film in particular I think there's a lot of Roman Polanski influence and Terry Gilliam influence as well as a Japanese director named Shinya Tsukamoto—he directed The Iron Man, Tetsuo." The visual style of Pi and Requiem for a Dream features numerous similarities to Tetsuo: The Iron Man.

The majority of reviewers characterized Requiem for a Dream in the genre of "drug movies", along with films like The Basketball Diaries, Trainspotting, Spun, and Fear and Loathing in Las Vegas. But, Aronofsky placed his movie in a wider context, saying:

Requiem for a Dream is not about heroin or about drugs ... The Harry-Tyrone-Marion story is a very traditional heroin story. But putting it side by side with the Sara story, we suddenly say, 'Oh, my God, what is a drug?' The idea that the same inner monologue goes through a person's head when they're trying to quit drugs, as with cigarettes, as when they're trying to not eat food so they can lose 20 pounds, was really fascinating to me. I thought it was an idea that we hadn't seen on film and I wanted to bring it up on the screen.

Dream logic is another leitmotif in Aronofsky's work.

In the Toronto International Film Festival interview conducted by James Rocchi, Aronofsky credited the 1957 Charles Mingus song "The Clown" as a major influence on The Wrestler. It is an instrumental piece, with a poem read over the music about a clown who accidentally discovers the bloodlust of the crowds and eventually kills himself in performance.

Aronofsky called Black Swan a companion piece to The Wrestler, recalling one of his early projects about a love affair between a wrestler and a ballerina. He eventually separated the wrestling and the ballet worlds, considering them as "too much for one movie". He compared the two films: "Wrestling some consider the lowest art—if they would even call it art—and ballet some people consider the highest art. But what was amazing to me was how similar the performers in both of these worlds are. They both make incredible use of their bodies to express themselves." About the psychological thriller nature of Black Swan, actress Natalie Portman compared the film's tone to Polanski's 1968 film Rosemary's Baby, while Aronofsky said Polanski's Repulsion (1965) and The Tenant (1976) were "big influences" on the final film. Actor Vincent Cassel also compared Black Swan to Polanski's early films, commenting that it was also influenced by Alejandro Jodorowsky's movies and David Cronenberg's early work.

Aronofsky has also mentioned that he "learned a lot" from Jean-Luc Godard's film Breathless.

== Reception of films ==
Requiem for a Dream was originally set for release in 2000, but it was met with controversy in the U.S., being rated NC-17 by the MPAA due to a graphic sex scene. Aronofsky appealed the rating, claiming that cutting any portion of the film would dilute its message. The appeal was denied and the film's distributor Artisan Entertainment decided to release the film unrated.

The question of who had designed 40 ballet costumes for Portman and the dancers in Black Swan was one publicized controversy related to the film. The media also gave substantial coverage to the dance double controversy: how much credit for the dancing in the film was being given to Portman and how much to her "dance double", Sarah Lane, an American Ballet Theatre soloist. Lane claimed to have danced more than she was credited. The director and Fox Searchlight disputed Lane's claim. Their released statements said, "We were fortunate to have Sarah there to cover the more complicated dance sequences and we have nothing but praise for the hard work she did. However, Natalie herself did most of the dancing featured in the final film."

Aronofsky said in an interview with Entertainment Weekly:

I had my editor count shots. There are 140 dance shots in the film. 111 are Natalie Portman untouched. 28 are her dance double Sarah Lane. If you do the math, that's 80% Natalie Portman. What about duration? The shots that feature the double are wide shots and rarely play for longer than one second. There are two complicated longer dance sequences that we used face replacement. Even so, if we were judging by time, over 90% would be Natalie Portman. And to be clear, Natalie did dance en pointe in pointe shoes. If you look at the final shot of the opening prologue, which lasts 85 seconds, and was danced completely by Natalie, she exits the scene on pointe. That is completely her without any digital magic.

Aronofsky's 2014 film Noah was banned on religious grounds in the United Arab Emirates, Malaysia, Qatar, and Indonesia, with other countries following suit. Box Office Mojo said it was one of the most controversial movies of the past 35 years, along with such titles as The Passion of the Christ or The Da Vinci Code.

Aronofsky's films have also been criticized for content and casting. His seventh film Mother! (2017) sparked controversy upon release due to its graphic and disturbing content, polarizing both critics and audiences. His eighth film The Whale (2022) also received controversy for lead star Brendan Fraser wearing a prosthetic suit; and for casting the heterosexual Fraser as a homosexual character. Some critics labeled the film's messaging relating to its lead character's obesity as fatphobic. In preparing for the role, Fraser consulted the Obesity Action Coalition (OAC) and conversed with members of the group about their life experiences. The OAC recognized the controversial use of prosthetics in portraying obesity, but the organization supported its role in the film because it helped "realistically portray one person's story with obesity, something rarely seen in media" rather than existing to "demean or ridicule".

Film	Rotten Tomatoes	Metacritic	CinemaScore	Budget	Box office
Pi	88%	72	—	$0.1 million	$4.7 million
Requiem for a Dream	79%	71	—	$4.5 million	$7.4 million
The Fountain	52%	51	C	$35 million	$16.5 million
The Wrestler	99%	80	—	$6 million	$46.6 million
Black Swan	85%	79	—	$13 million	$332.1 million
Noah	75%	68	C	$125–160 million	$359 million
Mother!	68%	76	F	$30 million	$44.5 million
The Whale	64%	60	—	$3 million	$57.6 million
Caught Stealing	85%	65	B	$40 million	$33.3 million

== Environmental activism ==
Aronofsky is known for his environmental activism and veganism. A number of his films, notably Noah and Mother!, can be read as environmental parables. In 2014 he traveled to the Alberta Tar Sands with the Sierra Club's Michael Brune and Leonardo DiCaprio. In 2015, he traveled to Alaska's Arctic National Wildlife Refuge with Brune, Keri Russell, and the leaders of several veterans groups.

In 2014, he received the Humane Filmmaker Award from the Humane Society of the United States.

In 2015, he collaborated with the artist JR on The Standing March, a public art installation in Paris encouraging diplomats at COP21 to take action against climate change.

He coproduced the 2022 documentary The Territory about a Brazilian rainforest tribe's fight to protect its existence from encroaching land grabbers.

He is a board member of the Sierra Club Foundation and The School for Field Studies.

== Personal life ==
Aronofsky began dating English actress Rachel Weisz in 2001, and they were engaged in 2005. They lived in Manhattan's East Village and had a son on May 31, 2006. In November 2010, they announced that they had been separated for months but were raising their son together.

In September 2016, he began dating American actress Jennifer Lawrence, whom he met during the filming of Mother!. The relationship ended in November 2017.

In 2018, Aronofsky was in a relationship with Russian actress Aglaya Tarasova, daughter of actress Kseniya Rappoport.

Aronofsky said of his spiritual beliefs in 2014, "I think I definitely believe. My biggest expression of what I believe is in The Fountain." In 2022, he said, "I do TM [Transcendental Meditation] and I love it. It's a really helpful exercise."

In 2024, both he and his sister Patti became Polish citizens. His Polish lawyer explained that Aronofsky applied for Polish citizenship to fulfill his parents' wish.

== Filmography ==
=== Film ===
Short film

Year	Title	Director	Writer	Producer	Notes
1991	Supermarket Sweep	Yes	Yes	No	Senior thesis film
1991	Fortune Cookie	Yes	No	Yes	AFI Conservatory masters program
1993	Protozoa	Yes	Yes	No	AFI Conservatory masters program
1994	No Time	Yes	No	No	AFI Conservatory masters program
2005	Trapped in the Television	Yes	No	No	Commissioned by Nokia at the Tribeca Film Festival

Feature film

Year	Title	Director	Writer	Producer
1998	Pi	Yes	Yes	No
2000	Requiem for a Dream	Yes	Yes	No
2002	Below	No	Yes	Yes
2006	The Fountain	Yes	Yes	No
2008	The Wrestler	Yes	No	Yes
2010	Black Swan	Yes	No	No
2014	Noah	Yes	Yes	Yes
2017	Mother!	Yes	Yes	No
2022	The Whale	Yes	No	Yes
2025	Caught Stealing	Yes	No	Yes

Producer only

- Jackie (2016)
- Aftermath (2017)
- White Boy Rick (2018)
- Some Kind of Heaven (2020)
- Catch the Fair One (2021)
- The Territory (2022)
- The Good Nurse (2022)
- Little Death (2024)
- Viktor (2024)
- Holding Liat (2025)
- Underland (2025)
- Pendulum (2027)

Executive producer

- The Fighter (2010)
- Zipper (2015)
- Serendipity (2019)

Acting credits

Year	Title	Role	Notes
1998	Pi	Assistant positive cutter	
2000	Requiem for a Dream	Visitor	Uncredited cameo
2022	Night of the Coconut	Himself	

=== Television ===
Year	Title	Role	Notes
2018	One Strange Rock	Executive producer	Documentary series
2022	Limitless with Chris Hemsworth	Creator and executive producer	Documentary series

=== Other credits ===
Year	Title	Role	Notes
1997	Soldier Boyz	Designer and cutscenes director	FMV Game
2018	Spheres: Songs of Spacetime	Producer	Virtual reality
2023	Postcard from Earth	Director, writer and producer	Bespoke production for the Sphere

== Awards and nominations ==
Awards and nominations received by Aronofsky's films
Year	Title	Academy Awards		BAFTA Awards		Golden Globe Awards	
Year	Title	Nominations	Wins	Nominations	Wins	Nominations	Wins
2000	Requiem for a Dream	1				1	
2006	The Fountain					1	
2008	The Wrestler	2		2	1	3	2
2010	Black Swan	5	1	12	1	4	1
2014	Noah					1	
2022	The Whale	3	2	4		1	
Total		11	3	18	2	10	3

Directed Academy Award performances
Under Aronofsky's direction, these actors have received Academy Award nominations and wins for their performances in their respective roles.

Year	Performer	Title	Result
Academy Award for Best Actor
2009	Mickey Rourke	The Wrestler	Nominated
2023	Brendan Fraser	The Whale	Won
Academy Award for Best Actress
2001	Ellen Burstyn	Requiem for a Dream	Nominated
2011	Natalie Portman	Black Swan	Won
Academy Award for Best Supporting Actress
2009	Marisa Tomei	The Wrestler	Nominated
2023	Hong Chau	The Whale	Nominated
