= Donor Unknown =

- Theatrical release poster
- Directed by: Jerry Rothwell
- Produced by: Jim Butterworth; Daniel J. Chalfen; Hilary Durman; Karen Gilchrist; Stewart Le Marechal; Al Morrow; Jonny Persey
- Starring: JoEllen Marsh; Jeffrey Harrison
- Edited by: Allan Mackay
- Music by: Max de Wardener
- Production company: Met Film/Redbird
- Release date: 3 June 2010
- Running time: 80 minutes
- Country: United Kingdom
- Language: English

Donor Unknown is a 2010 documentary film directed by Jerry Rothwell and produced by Al Morrow and Hilary Durman. A 21st-century tale of identity and genetic inheritance, this film tells the story of a sperm donor to a sperm bank and the children who want to meet him. It follows JoEllen Marsh as she goes in search of the sperm donor father she only knows as Donor 150.

== Plot outline ==
JoEllen, now 20, has always known her family ‘wasn't like other families'. She grew up in Lander, Pennsylvania in rural Warren County with two mothers, and a burning curiosity to know more about her anonymous donor father. When JoEllen discovers a unique online registry which connects donor-conceived children, she manages to track down a half-sister in New York. The New York Times picks up the story, and, over time 12 more half-siblings emerge across the United States. The article also falls into the hands of Jeffrey Harrison, living alone with four dogs and a pigeon in a broken-down RV in a Venice Beach car park. In the 1980s, Jeffrey supplemented his meager income by becoming a sperm donor at California Cryobank. His number was Donor 150.

Donor Unknown is a uniquely 21st-century story. The connections made between the children and their donor dad draw as much on modern technology as on old-fashioned coincidence. While the siblings seem to take their ever-expanding family in their stride, Jeffrey is more apprehensive about meeting some of his biological children for the first time. Funny, moving and surprising Donor Unknown raises intriguing questions about our understanding of parenthood, and the strange power of the genetic imperative.

== Television broadcast ==
It was broadcast on 28 June 2011 on the British channel More 4.

== Reception ==
Donor Unknown has been well received by critics and film goers alike. Peter Bradshaw of The Guardian called it a 'amusing and sweet-natured documentary' although he felt that there might be a deeper, more complex story to tell about the siblings' relations with each other and Harrison's own life. While Philip French, from The Observer, called it an 'engaging' film.

== Awards ==
It won the Silverdocs Audience Award which is the result of audience votes throughout the festival in Silver Spring, Maryland. The film also won the Tribeca (Online) Film Festival Award for Best Feature Film.

== See also ==
Spermworld – A 2024 documentary covering a similar topic
