= Postcard from Earth =

2023 film directed by Darren Aronofsky

- Directed by: Darren Aronofsky
- Written by: Darren Aronofsky; Ari Handel
- Produced by: Graham Booth; Darren Aronofsky; Ari Handel
- Starring: Brandon Santana; Zaya Ribeiro
- Narrated by: Arielle Jacobs; Brandon Santana
- Cinematography: Matthew Libatique; Andrew Shulkind
- Edited by: Jennifer Lame
- Music by: Brendan Angelides; Judson Crane; Nathan Johnson; Rob Simonsen; Joseph Trapanese; Ben Wynn; Jeremy Zuckerman
- Production companies: Protozoa Pictures; Sphere Studios
- Distributed by: Sphere Entertainment Co.
- Release date: October 6, 2023 (United States)
- Running time: 55 minutes
- Country: United States
- Language: English

Postcard from Earth is a 2023 4D science fiction and documentary film directed by Darren Aronofsky, starring Brandon Santana and Zaya Ribeiro, also voiced by Arielle Jacobs. Created specifically to be screened at Sphere in the Las Vegas Valley on the venue's 160,000 square-foot video screen, the film was shot in an 18K resolution with the Big Sky camera system. The 4D film features 270 degrees of viewing experience, climate control, haptic capabilities for the venue's seating, and scents to create an immersive environment that tells the story of life on Earth. The film is one of two entertainment features to inaugurate the Sphere, along with U2's concert residency. Postcard from Earth has received positive reviews from critics.

== Plot ==
On a distant planet, astronauts Byron (played by Brandon Santana) and Fang (played by Zaya Ribeiro, and voiced by Arielle Jacobs) land in a state of stasis. Technology on their ship brings them back to consciousness, and pre-recorded voice over messages from each other start to explain that they have been sent here from Earth and will require some time to get their bearings. A virtual reality presentation starts up, that explains the history of life on Earth, from the earliest single-cell organisms evolving up to humankind and the environmental devastation of the anthropocene. Due to ecological collapse, humans have had to take to the stars, making only occasional visits back to their home planet. Byron and Fang have been chosen to bring life to a new world in the hopes that they will take greater care of this ecosystem. After the presentation is done, the two take their first steps onto the surface of the new world, and technology from their ship covers it with greenery.

== Development and release ==
"I do think there is an illness in Hollywood of dystopian film. Stories that are helpless and hopeless and dark. It's important as a storyteller to start telling stories about protopia... [not of] a perfect future, or a future not based in any truths or reality... [but] stories that show a great future for humanity and for the planet and for our home."

— Darren Aronofsky on the attitude and theme of Postcard from Earth

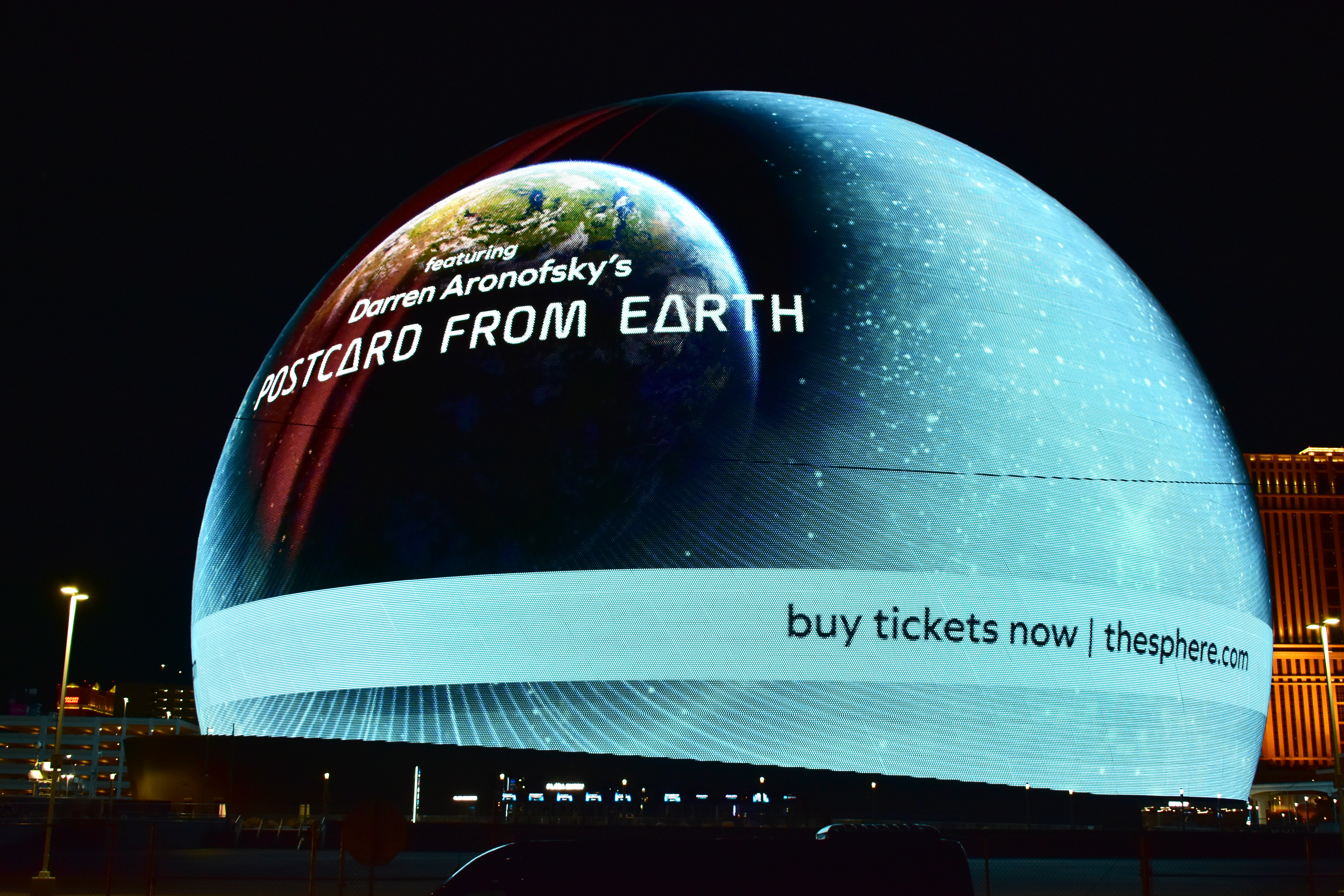
The exterior of the Sphere promoting the film

Aronofsky was approached to make the film by Jane Rosenthal of Tribeca Enterprises while Sphere was in the process of being built. Postcard from Earth is the first film to run at Sphere and take advantage of the venue's unique screen display, as well as the audio, climate control, and haptic features. Shooting took place across all continents and required a bespoke 18K resolution camera running at 60 frames per second and 30 GBytes/second. Aronofsky and his filmmaking partner Ari Handel worked with the initial prototype camera array which was used for one shot in the film.

== Reception ==
In the Las Vegas Review-Journal, John Katsilometes called Postcard from Earth a "movie about Earth [that] might be more convincing than the source material" and encouraged attendees to also engage with the Atrium show in the venue that makes for a "unique, next-level and worth the trip around the globe". Josh Bell of New Scientist praised the film's technical achievements but called the story "cheesy and simplistic" that is "a flimsy conceit that serves as an excuse for Aronofsky to deliver what audiences are really there for – to be immersed in the 18K-resolution (a display resolution using about 18,000 pixels horizontally) images shot on every continent, from canyons to oceans, crowded streets to quiet cathedrals". The Wall Street Journal's Kyle Smith called the story a "trite setup [that] is merely the frame upon which the director stretches his massive tableaux" that praised the viewing experience in spite of the "hokey" storytelling. At TheWrap, Peter Csathy called this film "a triumph in all respects".

=== Accolades ===
Postcard from Earth won in the category of Outstanding Visual Effects in a Special Venue Project at the 22nd Visual Effects Society Awards.
