= Some Kind of Heaven =

2020 American documentary film

- Theatrical release poster
- Directed by: Lance Oppenheim
- Produced by: Darren Aronofsky; Jeffrey Soros; Simon Horsman; Kathleen Lingo; Melissa Oppenheim Lano; Pacho Velez; Lance Oppenheim
- Cinematography: David Bolen
- Edited by: Daniel Garber; Lance Oppenheim
- Music by: Ari Balouzian
- Production companies: Protozoa Pictures; Los Angeles Media Fund; The New York Times
- Distributed by: Magnolia Pictures
- Release dates: January 26, 2020 (Sundance); January 15, 2021 (United States)
- Running time: 83 minutes
- Country: United States
- Language: English
- Box office: $53,222

Some Kind of Heaven is a 2020 American documentary film about The Villages, Florida, the world's largest retirement community. Marking the directorial feature debut of Lance Oppenheim, the film is a stylized portrait of four residents living within The Villages, struggling to find happiness and meaning in life's final chapters. The film, produced by Darren Aronofsky, The New York Times, and Los Angeles Media Fund, premiered at the 2020 Sundance Film Festival in the NEXT section. It was released in theaters and on-demand in the United States on January 15, 2021, by Magnolia Pictures.

== Synopsis ==
Set at The Villages, a retirement community often called "Disney World for Retirees", the film focuses on four residents living on the margins, striving to find happiness. From synchronized swimming to pickleball, the good life is waiting, as well as a discounted funeral package now at a new, lower price. While most residents have bought into the community's packaged positivity, married couple Anne and Reggie wrestle with Reggie's deteriorating grip on reality and psychedelic drug use; Barbara, a widow, seeks second love; and Dennis, an 82-year-old bachelor, living out of a van, searches for a wealthy woman to take care of him for his remaining years. Reviewer Vikram Murthi noted that though the film "illustrates the gap between The Villages' advertising copy and the practical reality of living there", it invests more in the "dreams and desires of its residents".

== Cast ==
Featured personnel in the documentary are credited as themselves:

- Anne Kincer
- Reggie Kincer
- Barbara Lochiatto
- Dennis Dean
- Lynn Henry
- Gary Schwartz

== Development and production ==
The film initially emerged from director Lance Oppenheim's undergraduate thesis in the Visual and Environmental Studies program at Harvard University, where he collaborated with classmate and co-producer Christian Vazquez. At Harvard, Oppenheim worked on an earlier version of the film under the tutelage of filmmakers Robb Moss, Ross McElwee, Lucien Castaing-Taylor, and Alfred Guzzetti, which informed the creation of the rest of the project. The film continued to develop through the Sundance Ignite program.

A Floridian, Oppenheim was interested in returning home to explore why "thousands of retirees were moving across the country, isolating themselves in a Truman Show-like bubble-world that reminded them of their youth". Before filming, Oppenheim ventured to The Villages and lived in a rented room for nearly thirty days with retired rodeo clowns to embed himself into the social fabric of the community. Production took place over four shoots (scattered across eighteen months) with a crew of five—Oppenheim, Vazquez, cinematographer David Bolen, Melissa Oppenheim Lano (Oppenheim's sister and lead physical producer), and sound recordist Richard Carlos. Bolen, the cinematographer of the film, worked with Oppenheim to develop the heightened style and look of the film before production. Bolen and Oppenheim have been collaborating since the latter was 17 years old. Using inspiration from Larry Sultan's Pictures from Home series, Ulrich Seidl, Todd Haynes' Safe, and Tim Burton's Edward Scissorhands, Oppenheim and Bolen wanted the film's images to mirror the controlled, manicured and hyperreal landscapes of The Villages.

After collaborating with Kathleen Lingo at The New York Times on his three previous short documentaries for Op-Docs, Oppenheim approached Lingo regarding the film, initially envisioning it as a short documentary. Lingo urged Oppenheim to develop the project into a feature, thus sparking their fourth collaboration—and one of The New York Times' first feature film productions—together. Darren Aronofsky met Oppenheim when he was still a senior in college after Oppenheim "found [his] email on the internet" and spent nearly five years sending unsolicited cold emails. Upon finally getting in touch with Aronofsky and his team at Protozoa Pictures, Oppenheim shared a sizzle reel to the film. Aronofsky, impressed with the surreal setting and film's visual approach, signed on shortly after.

Editor Daniel Garber joined the project, starting when only a quarter of the footage had been shot. Garber worked with Oppenheim to shape the film's stories, even visiting The Villages to get a better sense of the place. In interviews, Oppenheim has credited Garber as the film's "co-author", and being integral in the creating a grammar that "was more experiential than other documentaries... something that felt like a narrative film but retained the integrity of being 100% grounded in reality". Oppenheim and composer Ari Balouzian conceived of the score as an "integral part of the story they wanted to tell", embracing a "dreamy, orchestral sounds with harp inflections that invoke Old Hollywood to capture the tension between the sunny, polished exterior of The Villages and its harsher day-to-day realities".

== Critical response ==
On the review aggregator Rotten Tomatoes, the film holds an approval rating of 93% based on 84 reviews, with an average of 7.7/10 as of 10 October 2021. The website's critics' consensus reads: "Some Kind of Heaven could have gone deeper into its subject, but it remains a breezily entertaining look at some interesting people."

The film was described by Dennis Harvey of Variety as "highly entertaining ... those nostalgic for the fond portraits of eccentric Americana in Errol Morris' early work—and pretty much everyone else—will be delighted by the film". Beandrea July of The Hollywood Reporter echoed similar sentiments, remarking that the film is a "solid feature debut from a bright young filmmaker who, despite his age, is able to expand our understanding of the complicated lives of older Americans".

Vadim Rizov of Filmmaker praised the film for possessing a "visual discipline rare in US nonfiction", as did Vikram Murthi of review site RogerEbert.com who wrote: "Oppenheim's keen compositional sense perfectly bolsters the film's narrative: each carefully crafted frame provides whomever is in it with inherent worth".

Eric Hynes of Film Comment took particular interest in the "age gap between Oppenheim and his subjects", impressed by the level of trust and respect that Oppenheim was able to foster: "I'm intrigued by a young filmmaker identifying with persons at the other end of the life cycle, and the older subjects, in turn, respecting and trusting someone like Oppenheim with the less-than-cute fogey matters of loneliness, financial insecurity, marital discord, and unceasingly disorienting change. I hazard to think that the film's mutual curiosity gives Some Kind of Heaven its vivifying spirit, that transforms what might have been familiarly charming and smirkily knowing into something more troubling, elusive, and enduring".
