= Wesley Wang =

American film director (born 2004)

- Wang in 2026
- Born: May 14, 2004 (age 22); Jericho, New York
- Chess career
- Country: United States
- Title: FIDE Master (2018)
- Peak rating: 2341 (April 2023)

Wesley Wang is an American film director and screenwriter. He is best known for his short film nothing, except everything. (2023), which was planned to be adapted into a feature film produced by Darren Aronofsky and Sony's TriStar Pictures before Wang separated from Sony in 2026. He was on Forbes 30 Under 30 in 2024. In 2026, he founded Wesley Wang Media, a studio to help distribute his work, alongside other potentially viral intellectual property.

== Early life ==
Wang is from Long Island, and attended Jericho High School in Jericho, New York. As a competitive chess player, he became a FIDE Master in 2018. He started the non-profit CHESSanity in 2014 to promote chess in underprivileged schools across the country. He attended Harvard College, however as of 2026 he has dropped out to found Wesley Wang Media.

== Career ==
During his senior year of high school, Wang wrote and directed the short film nothing, except everything. (2023). To have the project made, he taught chess lessons for funding and cold-emailed hundreds of producers before Scott Aharoni agreed to produce. After having its world premiere at the Academy Award-qualifying Indy Shorts International Film Festival, the film went onto garner over 8.9 million views on YouTube.

The film received mixed reviews, with some praising its technical aspects and depiction of Gen Z culture whilst others criticizing the film's heavy-handedness in its existentialist themes and Wang's privileged position as a factor in the film's success.

Sparking a bidding war, the rights to the feature adaptation were then bought by TriStar, with Darren Aronofsky's Protozoa Pictures producing. The feature is now in development.

On June 11, 2026, Wesley uploaded to his YouTube channel an animated short film entitled Violet and Marlowe Rob a Bank (stylized in all caps). The short is a music video for the song "Feel It All Again" by the band adore. Violet and Marlowe is a CGI animated short film about a rabbit couple attempting to thwart a monopoly in the carrot market. The short won Best Animated Short at the Tribeca Film Festival, where it initially premiered.

Alongside the premiere of Violet and Marlowe, Wesley announced that he was founding his own studio, Wesley Wang Media. This studio, according to Wang himself, is meant to be "...the A24 of the creator economy". Via Wesley Wang Media and merch sales, he intends to raise money for a full Violet and Marlowe movie. Wang, in the comments of the YouTube upload, said "...now we deeply want to make this into a FULL LENGTH MOVIE with a larger team based off [a promotional Instagram reel featuring the bunnies in an office]." He further elaborated during an interview with IGN that the movie would be a prequel to the short film, and that he's also working on adapting Violet and Marlowe into a video game.

On September 16, 2026, Wang officially announced Wesley Wang Media, and its first slate of projects. While the idea had been discussed before, it was not officially announced until a Deadline article confirmed it. The initial slate of programming includes interactive programs, a prequel film and TV show to Violet and Marlowe, and a series to help amateur filmmakers make films, similar to Project Greenlight.

Alongside this announcement, it was revealed Wang had parted ways with Sony Pictures the month prior, and the nothing, except everything film would not proceed with Sony.

== Filmography ==
Short film

Year	Title	Director	Writer	Producer
2022	Mute	Yes	Yes	Yes
2023	nothing, except everything.	Yes	Yes	No
2024	You Are Seen	Yes	Yes	No
2026	Violet and Marlowe Rob A Bank	Yes	Yes	Yes

Feature film

Year	Title	Director	Writer	Notes
TBA	nothing, except everything.	Yes	Yes	In development
