= AJK TV (UK) =

British television production company

AJK TV is a British television production company, based in Marple, Greater Manchester. Their main emphasis is in motorsport and has produced programs for the Motors TV channel.

== Motorsport series ==
They have produced television programs and DVDs for the following UK based motorsport series:

2008
British Cross Country Championship
Scottish XR2 Championship
Scottish Sports and Saloon Car Championship
Scottish Mini Cooper Cup
Scottish Legends Championship
Scottish Formula Ford Championship
Scottish Classic Sports and Saloon Car Championship

2009
Scottish Sports and Saloon Car Championship
Scottish Mini Cooper Cup
Scottish Legends Championship
Scottish FF1600 Championship
Scottish Classic Sports and Saloon Car Championship
Scottish XR2 Championship and Fiesta ST Cup
National Legends Championship

2010
Competition Car Insurance Ford Fiesta Championship
Castle Combe 60th Anniversary
Scottish Mini Cooper Cup
Open Rally Cross
Scottish Sports and Saloon Car Championship
Scottish XR2 Championship and Fiesta ST Cup
Scottish Tarmac Rally Championship
Scottish Classic Sports and Saloon Car Championship
Scottish FF1600 Championship
Scottish Legends Championship
Tour of Mull Rally

== Notable Presenters ==
During the first few seasons of coverage AJK TV has two main presenters for its coverage. Sasha Brunton is an instructor with the Knockhill Racing School. Lloyd Bonson is a former saloon car mechanic with a background in theatre and radio.
