= Viktor (2024 film) =

2024 documentary film

- Directed by: Olivier Sarbil
- Produced by: Olivier Sarbil; Darren Aronofsky; Dylan Golden; Sigrid Dyekjær; Philippe Levasseuer; Brendan Naylor
- Cinematography: Olivier Sarbil
- Edited by: Atanas Georgiev
- Music by: Disasterpeace
- Production companies: Protozoa Pictures; Impact Partners; Time Studios; Real Lava; Newen Studios
- Release date: September 8, 2024 (TIFF)
- Running time: 89 minutes
- Countries: United States; Ukraine; France; Denmark
- Languages: Ukrainian; Russian

Viktor (Ukrainian: «Віктор», Russian: «Виктор») is a 2024 documentary film, directed by Olivier Sarbil and produced by Real Lava and Protozoa. It explores the Russian invasion of Ukraine through the perspective of a deaf person. Darren Aronofsky serves as a producer under his Protozoa Pictures banner along with Real Lava headed by Sigrid Dyekjær.

It had its world premiere in the Platform Prize program at the Toronto International Film Festival on September 8, 2024.

== Premise ==
Explores the Russian invasion of Ukraine through the perspective of a deaf person.

== Production ==
The film received support from the SFFILM Documentary Film Fund.

== Release ==
It had its world premiere at the Toronto International Film Festival in September 2024.
