= Los Angeles Media Fund =

American entertainment company

Los Angeles Media Fund, LLC
- Company type: Private
- Industry: Entertainment
- Founded: September 2014
- Founder: Jeffrey Soros; Simon Horsman
- Headquarters: 9255 Sunset Boulevard (Suite 515), West Hollywood, California 90069, United States
- Area served: Worldwide
- Services: Film production; Film finance
- Website: lamf.la

Los Angeles Media Fund (LAMF) is an entertainment and media company involved in producing and financing feature films, unscripted and scripted television, sports, music, theatre and live events.

== Overview ==
Launched in 2014 by Jeffrey Soros and Simon Horsman, Los Angeles Media Fund is a multi-faceted entertainment company with a primary focus on the development, financing, and production of features, documentaries and television. The firm also has several strategic investments with partners in scripted and unscripted television, live events, and recently launched a sports management firm.

== Filmography ==
=== Completed ===
Year	Title
2025	Move Ya Body: The Birth of House
2024	Rob Peace
2023	Magazine Dreams
2023	Cora Bora
2021	The Exchange
2020	Some Kind of Heaven
2020	Shirley
2018	Juliet, Naked
2018	United Skates
2018	Step Sisters
2017	Shot in the Dark
2017	The Space Between Us
2017	The Bye Bye Man
2016	Dark Crimes
