= Ari Nagel =

American mathematician and sperm donor

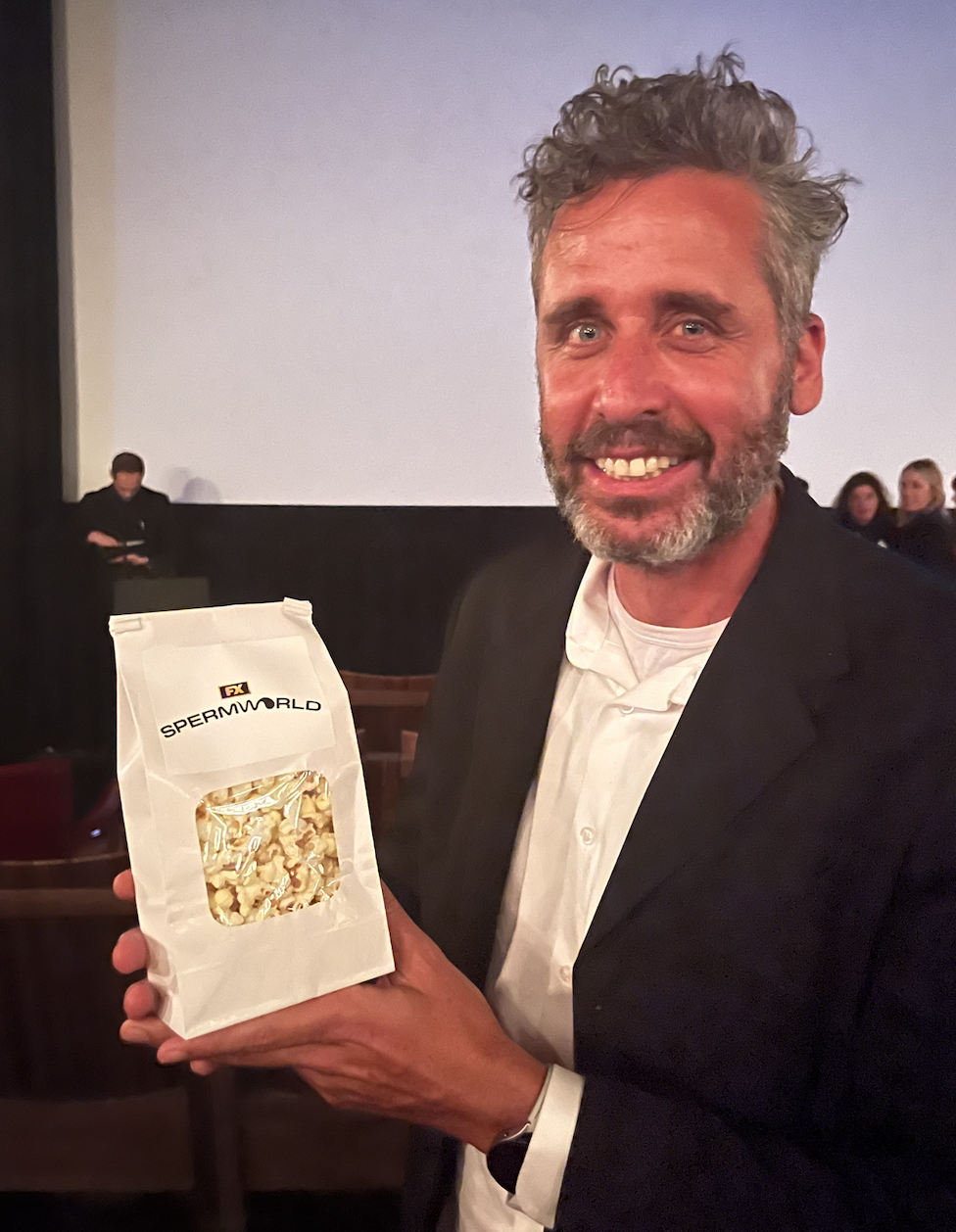
- Born: 1975 or 1976 (age 50–51); Monsey, New York, U.S.
- Occupation: Mathematics professor
- Known for: Prolific sperm donor
- Children: 180+

Academic work
- Discipline: Mathematics and computer science
- Institutions: Kingsborough Community College

Ari Nagel (1975 or 1976) is an American mathematics professor and a sperm donor who has fathered more than 165 children as of June 2024. He has been nicknamed the Sperminator or the Target Donor, after the American retail corporation in whose stores some of his artificial-insemination donations were performed.

== Early life ==
Ari Nagel was born to an Orthodox Jewish family in Monsey, New York, as the fifth of seven children. He spent his childhood in Monsey, attending school at Yeshiva of Spring Valley and Yeshiva Shaarei Torah, and later studied at St. John's University in New York City. Nagel received a large monetary settlement from a motorcycle accident and traveled around the world, after which he became irreligious. He also studied at the London School of Economics. After returning to New York, he became a professor at the Kingsborough Community College of the City University of New York teaching mathematics and computer science. Nagel's first child was born in 2003 as a result of an unintended pregnancy. He married the mother but they maintained separate apartments.

== Sperm donation ==
When his first son was a toddler, Nagel made his first sperm donation to a lesbian couple who advertised on Craigslist. Shortly thereafter he donated to a single woman he knew, following which he registered in the Known Donor Registry and donated a couple of times a year. In 2016, the New York Post reported that Nagel had fathered 22 children, nicknaming him the "Sperminator". Shortly after the story was published, the New York State Department of Health sent Nagel a letter informing him that operating an unlicensed sperm bank was illegal, but did not escalate the matter. As of 2021, Nagel continued to operate outside of any regulatory framework, and provides sperm donations without formal legal contracts.

Nagel maintains contact with many of the children he has fathered, but does not generally support the children financially. He has been successfully sued by five mothers (of nine children) for child support, and half of his university paycheck is garnished towards these payments. Nagel often travels to prospective recipients, with the recipients paying for his flight fare, and the sperm is provided free of charge as a donation. Nagel originally made many of his donations with natural insemination, but later switched to artificial insemination, delivering his sperm in a "cup" to protect himself, and the mothers to whom he donates sperm, from the risks of frequent unprotected sex. Some of his artificial donations were performed in restrooms of Target department stores, leading to the nickname "Target Donor".

In 2018, Israeli authorities banned him from donating sperm; his appeal against the decision was rejected by the Supreme Court of Israel. The court ruled that it was "doubtful he [Nagel] can function as an actual father" due to the number of his children.

During the COVID-19 pandemic, the pace of Nagel's donations increased as he was teaching remotely, and had a greater ability to travel. Around sixty of the mothers of Nagel's babies formed a private Facebook group and refer to themselves as "Ari's baby mamas". As of May 2020, he has fathered more than 100 children.

In a 2021 interview with Esquire, he repeated his 2017 claim that he was considering retiring from sperm donation to focus on his existing children, and because of the impact of age on sperm quality.

== Documentaries ==
His activities as a sperm donor have been portrayed in the documentary films The Sperminator (2017), The Baby Daddy (2022) and Spermworld (2024). He was featured in a 2022 episode of This Is Life with Lisa Ling entitled "Got Sperm?".
