= Spermworld =

2024 American documentary film

- Promotional poster by Nick Drnaso
- Directed by: Lance Oppenheim
- Produced by: Lauren Belfer; Lance Oppenheim; Sophie Kissinger; Christian Vazquez; Alana Hauser; Daniel Garber; Kathleen Lingo; Josh Kriegman; Elyse Steinberg; Eli B. Despres
- Cinematography: David Bolen
- Edited by: Daniel Garber
- Music by: Ari Balouzian
- Production companies: FXP; The New York Times; Edgeline Films; To Be Formed
- Distributed by: FX
- Release dates: February 29, 2024 (True/False); March 29, 2024 (United States)
- Running time: 83 minutes
- Country: United States
- Language: English

Spermworld is a 2024 American documentary film directed by Lance Oppenheim that premiered on Hulu and FX in the United States on March 29, 2024. Spermworld follows the stories of three sperm donors and their recipients. Inspired by Nellie Bowles' article "The Sperm Kings Have a Problem: Too Much Demand" for the New York Times, the documentary ventures into "spermworld", the unregulated online marketplaces where sperm donors connect with hopeful parents.

== Cast ==
Featured personnel in the documentary are credited as themselves (in order of appearance)

- Tyree Kelly
- Atasha Peña Clay
- Steve Walker
- Rachel Stanley
- Ari Nagel

== Release ==
The film had its world premiere at True/False Film Festival on February 29, 2024. It was released in the United States on FX on March 29, 2024.

== Reception ==
=== Critical Response ===
On the review aggregator website Rotten Tomatoes, 80% of 5 critics' reviews are positive, with an average rating of 7/10 and audience reviews were 97% based on over 100 ratings.

John Serba for Decider stated: "Spermworld (now streaming on FX and Hulu) is one of those wild and rare documentaries about a subculture you likely aren’t aware exists, although you probably aren’t surprised that it actually does: a community of sperm donors and recipients who meet in Facebook groups, and essentially engage in DNA exchanges without the oversight of doctors or any other medical system. The film is directed by one of the best young documentary filmmakers to emerge in recent years, Lance Oppenheim, who seems to have embedded himself into the lives of three men as they sell or donate their semen to women who yearn to be mothers. And as Oppenheim made the best documentary of 2020, Some Kind of Heaven, he may have just made the best one of 2024 too."

=== Accolades ===
Year	Award	Category	Recipient(s)	Result	Ref.
2025	18th Cinema Eye Honors	Outstanding Broadcast Film	Lance Oppenheim	Nominated	

== See also ==
Donor Unknown – A 2010 documentary covering a similar topic
