= Florida Film Critics Circle Awards 2010 =

Annual US film awards ceremony

15th FFCC Awards

December 20, 2010

Best Picture:
The Social Network

The 15th Florida Film Critics Circle Awards were given on December 20, 2010.

== Winners ==
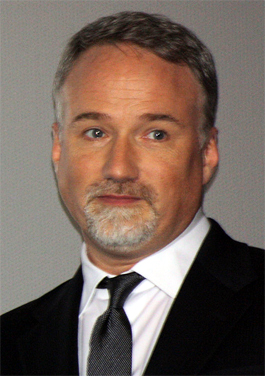
David Fincher, Best Director winner

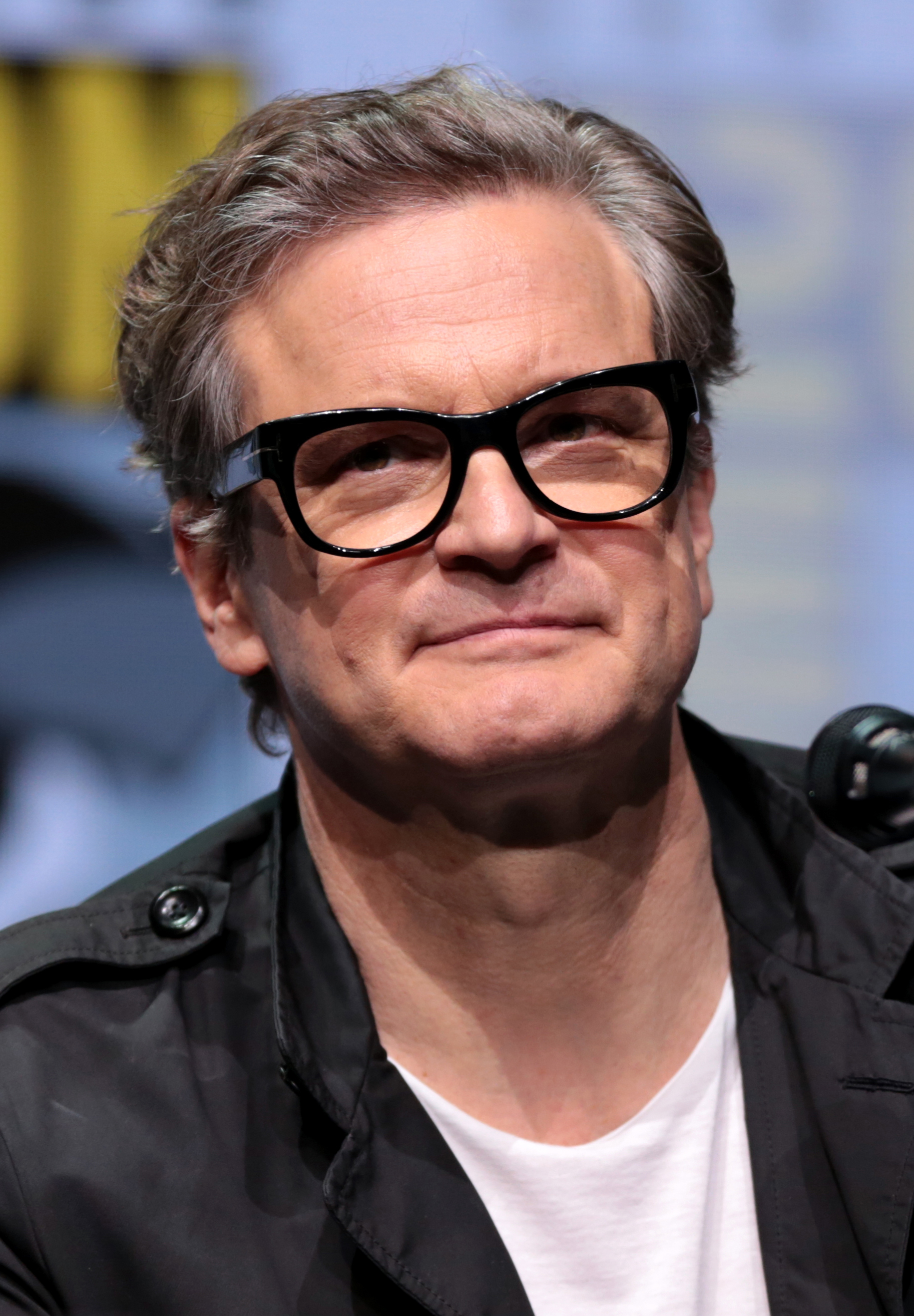
Colin Firth, Best Actor winner

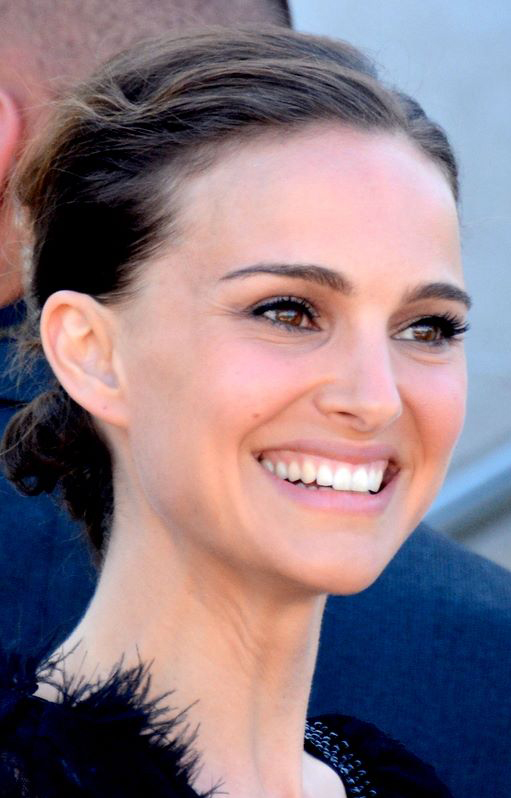
Natalie Portman, Best Actress winner

- Best Actor:
  - Colin Firth – The King's Speech
- Best Actress:
  - Natalie Portman – Black Swan
- Best Adapted Screenplay:
  - Aaron Sorkin – The Social Network
- Best Animated Film:
  - Toy Story 3
- Best Art Direction/Production Design:
  - Inception – Brad Ricker and Guy Hendrix Dyas
- Best Cinematography:
  - Inception – Wally Pfister
- Best Director:
  - David Fincher – The Social Network
- Best Documentary Film:
  - The Tillman Story
- Best Film:
  - The Social Network
- Best Foreign Language Film:
  - I Am Love (Io sono l'amore) • Italy
- Best Original Screenplay:
  - Christopher Nolan – Inception
- Best Supporting Actor:
  - Christian Bale – The Fighter
- Best Supporting Actress:
  - Melissa Leo – The Fighter
- Best Visual Effects:
  - Inception
- Pauline Kael Breakout Award:
  - Jennifer Lawrence – Winter's Bone
- Golden Orange for Outstanding Contribution to Film:
  - Matthew Curtis, programming director for the Enzian Theater and Florida Film Festival in Orlando
