= Lance Oppenheim =

American filmmaker (born 1996)

- Oppenheim in 2026
- Born: January 26, 1996 (age 30); Hollywood, Florida, U.S.
- Education: Harvard University (BA)
- Occupation: Filmmaker
- Years active: 2013–present
- Spouse: Abigail Rowe (m. 2025)
- Children: 1
- Website: tobeformed.com

Lance Oppenheim (born January 26, 1996) is an American filmmaker. His work blends nonfiction storytelling with heightened, cinematic formalism. Oppenheim's documentaries include the films Some Kind of Heaven (2020) about The Villages, Florida; Spermworld (2024), about unregulated sperm donation; and You Can See Everything (2026), about Elizabeth Holmes, which he co-directed with Nathan Fielder. He also directed the HBO documentary series Ren Faire (2024), about the Texas Renaissance Festival. He made his narrative film directorial debut in 2026 with Primetime.

== Early life and education ==
Oppenheim was born on January 26, 1996, to a Jewish family in Hollywood, Florida, and grew up in Weston, Florida. His parents are both real estate attorneys. He attended Pine Crest School from 2010 to 2014. He graduated from Harvard University in 2019 with a bachelor's degree in visual and environmental studies. At Harvard, Oppenheim studied with filmmakers Ross McElwee, Robb Moss, and Guy Maddin, and lived in Adams House.

== Career ==
In high school, Oppenheim directed several short documentaries, one of which (Quicksand) PBS distributed nationwide. He sent documentary pitches to the New York Times Op-Docs' open submission portal, documenting "crazy things happening in [his] backyard", which the Times would "politely reject". While in college, Oppenheim directed three short documentaries acquired and distributed by The New York Times Op-Docs. At 18 years old, Oppenheim did an internship as a script reader at A24, where he read an early 2013 draft of Uncut Gems. He notably gave the script a 'Consider' rating rather than a 'Highly recommend', a decision he later joked about feeling guilty over.

His short The Happiest Guy in the World, about long-term cruise passenger Mario Salcedo, premiered at the Tribeca Film Festival in 2018.

Oppenheim directed and produced his debut feature, Some Kind of Heaven, a documentary exploring life inside The Villages, Florida, as part of his undergraduate senior thesis. It follows four people living in The Villages and how they cope with later adult life. The film was produced by filmmaker Darren Aronofsky and The New York Times as one of the paper's first feature-length productions. It premiered at the 2020 Sundance Film Festival and International Film Festival Rotterdam to critical acclaim and was later acquired by Magnolia Pictures.

In 2023, Oppenheim appeared on the Forbes 30 Under 30 list in Hollywood & Entertainment. His second film, Spermworld, premiered at the 2024 True/False Film Festival to critical acclaim, and is available on FX, Disney +, and Hulu. In 2024, Oppenheim completed his first television series, Ren Faire. The series, produced by HBO and Elara Pictures, premiered at the 2024 South by Southwest Film Festival. In 2025, Oppenheim served as a producer on The Python Hunt, directed by Xander Robin and produced by Artists Equity.

Oppenheim made his narrative feature film directorial debut with Primetime (2026), starring Robert Pattinson as To Catch a Predator host Chris Hansen. The same year, Oppenheim co-directed and produced the documentary You Can See Everything with Nathan Fielder. The film was a critical and commercial success. At the box office, the film had the second-best opening weekend ever for a non-musical documentary and the biggest per-venue average for a film playing in under 1,000 theaters since Borat in 2006.

== Personal life ==
Oppenheim is married to Abigail Rowe, a producer. They have a son. Oppenheim developed the concept for Primetime after Rowe ordered him a Cameo video from Chris Hansen as a birthday gift.

In October 2026, Oppenheim was accused of stealing footage for his 2017 short film No Jail Time: The Movie. Oppenheim sold the film to The New York Times, which has defended inclusion of the footage as fair use.

== Filmography ==
=== Feature film ===
Year	Title	Director	Producer	Notes
2026	Primetime	Yes	Executive	

=== Short film ===
Year	Title	Director	Producer	Editor	Notes	Ref.
2012	The Dogmatic	Yes	Yes	Yes		
2013	Quicksand	Yes	Yes	Yes		
2014	The Off Season	Yes	Yes	Yes		
2016	Long Term Parking	Yes	Yes	Yes	New York Times Op-Doc	
2017	No Jail Time: The Movie	Yes	Yes	Yes	New York Times Op-Doc	
2018	The Happiest Guy in the World	Yes	Yes	Yes	New York Times Op-Doc	
2018	The Paradise Next Door	Yes	Yes	Yes	New York Times Op-Doc	
2024	Frank	No	Yes	No		

=== Documentary film ===
Year	Title	Director	Producer	Notes
2020	Some Kind of Heaven	Yes	Yes	Also co-editor
2024	Spermworld	Yes	Yes	
2025	The Python Hunt	No	Yes	
2026	You Can See Everything	Yes	Yes	Co-directed with Nathan Fielder

=== Documentary series ===
Year	Title	Director	Producer	Creator
2024	Ren Faire	Yes	Yes	Yes

=== Music video ===
Year	Song	Director	Artist
2026	"Lost Boys"	Yes	Phoebe Bridgers

== Awards and nominations ==
Year	Award	Category	Work	Result	Ref.
Cinema Eye Honors	2021	Outstanding Achievement in a Debut Feature Film	Some Kind of Heaven	Nominated	
Cinema Eye Honors	2025	Outstanding Broadcast Film	Spermworld	Nominated	
Cinema Eye Honors	2025	Outstanding Non Fiction Series	Ren Faire	Nominated	
Critics Choice Documentary Awards	2024	Best Limited Documentary Series	Ren Faire	Nominated	
Critics Choice Documentary Awards	2026	Best Director	You Can See Everything	Won	
Critics Choice Documentary Awards	2026	Best Documentary Feature	You Can See Everything	Won	
Gotham Awards	2026	Best Feature	Primetime	Pending	
Gotham Awards	2026	Best Documentary	You Can See Everything	Pending	
Gotham Awards	2026	Audience Award	You Can See Everything	Pending	
Gotham TV Awards	2025	Breakthrough Nonfiction Series	Ren Faire	Nominated	
Independent Spirit Awards	2025	Best New Non-Scripted or Documentary Series	Ren Faire	Nominated	
Grammy Awards	2027	Best Music Video	Lost Boys	Pending	
