= Timeline of the introduction of color television in countries and territories =

Introduction of color television in countries by decade

The following will consist of a catalog of times at which nations, and some subnational divisions, had their first color television broadcasts (transmissions available to the public). Non-public field-tests, closed-circuit demonstrations, and broadcasts received from other countries are not included. Also listed are the dates when the last black-and-white stations switched to color or ceased non–color-compatible transmission to black-and-white receivers; these are in red type.

== List in alphabetical order by country and territory ==
Note: Asterisks (*) after locations below are for "Television in LOCATION" links.

Country	Year color TV was introduced (the year of completion is in red)	Network or channel	Color system	Notes
Abkhazia	1980	National Television of Abkhaz ASSR	SECAM	
Albania *	1981/1982	RTSH	PAL	Color broadcasts started in 1981 and became full-time by 1982. Color broadcasts had been available from Yugoslavia since 1971 and Italy since 1977. Frequencies have been occasionally jammed due to censorship of some programs in Albania in that time.
Algeria *	1973/1979	RTA	PAL	RTA transmitted in the older French 819-line standard System E, until 1973 when it started broadcasting in 625-line standard System B.
American Samoa	1969	KVZK-2	NTSC	KVZK-2 was a National Educational Television affiliate.
Angola *	1983	TPA	PAL	
Argentina *	1978/1980	LS 82 Canal 7	PAL	Introduced for the 1978 FIFA World Cup by A78TV (Argentina 78 TV), a purpose-built system that took over the signals of channels 7 and 13 for the telecast of the Cup's games, even though only the finals and several second-round matches were broadcast in color for the domestic market. LS 82 Canal 7 became ATC (Argentina Televisora Color) on 3 May 1979, with partial color telecasts, which were officially authorized to begin, at is full, at midnight on Thursday, 1 May 1980 on both ATC and LS 85 Canal 13, the latter of which had carried out late-night tests for several months beforehand and previously undertook non-public experimental transmissions under the NTSC system in 1969, but the project was cancelled due to lack of government approval but they returned in 1971 with non satisfactory results. Full-time color transmissions by late 1980-early 1981. Color broadcasts had been available from Brazil since 1972, Chile and Paraguay since 1978. Uses the PAL-N system.
Armenia *. - Armenian SSR	1973/1981	Armenia 1	SECAM, PAL	First transmission was the 1973 May Day Parade in Yerevan. Full-time color transmissions since 1981.
Aruba	1973/1977	Telearuba	NTSC	Color broadcasting was introduced in 1973 after tests, but there were still black and white programs that were received from Venezuela until around 1977.
Australia *	1967/1971/1974/1975	ATV-0 (now ATV-10).	PAL	Permanent color telecasts since Saturday, 1 March 1975. First color test broadcast on Thursday, 15 June 1967, with live coverage of the Pakenham races. Many television shows were produced and broadcast in color between 1972 and 1974, with limited color telecasts from mid-1974 on.
Austria *	1969/1975	ORF	PAL	First transmission was the Eurovision broadcast of the New Year Concert from Vienna on Wednesday, 1 January 1969. Full-time color transmissions since 15 January 1975.
Azerbaijan *. - Azerbaijan SSR	1973/1978	AzTV	SECAM, PAL	First color broadcasts in Azerbaijan started in 1973 using the SECAM standard. Full color service started in 1978.
Bahamas *	1983	ZNS-TV	NTSC	Color transmissions had been available from Miami since 1954 (WTVJ) and West Palm Beach since the late 1950s
Bangladesh *	1980	BTV	PAL	Color transmissions launched by President Ziaur Rahman on 16 December 1980, marking the first official full-time color broadcasts in South Asia.
Barbados *	1971/1984	CBC	NTSC	
Belarus *. - Byelorussian SSR	1974	Belteleradio	SECAM	Full-time color service came in 1974 with SECAM.
Belize	1984	Channel 7	NTSC	Color broadcasts have been available from Mexico since 1964.
Benin	1982	OTRB	SECAM	
Belgium *	1971/1977	RTB; BRT	PAL	Color broadcasts from France (SECAM), Germany and The Netherlands (PAL) were available since 1967. Early receivers were very costly owing to multiple standards: PAL/SECAM/625 lines and monochrome/819 lines.
Bermuda *	1968/1970/1971	ZBM-TV; ZFB-TV	NTSC	
Bolivia *	1976/1980	TV Boliviana	NTSC	Experimental color broadcasts began in 1976; the first station to broadcast in color was Televisión Universitaria UAJMS from Tarija. Full-time color arrived in 1980. Color broadcasts have been available from Brazil since 1972, but were PAL-M.
Bosnia and Herzegovina *. - SR Bosnia and Herzegovina	1972/1975	Radiotelevizija Sarajevo (now BHT1).	PAL	First color transmission came from Belgrade in December 1971, local service began regular color broadcasts in 1972, but some programmes on Televizija Sarajevo began broadcasting in color by 1974, and full-time broadcasts began in early/mid 1975 when news programs, such as Dnevnik started to broadcast its editions in color.
Brazil *	1962/1972/1976	Bandeirantes; Globo; Record	PAL-M	First South American country to receive color television. Early closed circuit color demonstrations were done between 1957–58 to 1962 on Tupi, followed by on air color transmissions (unofficial and just for specific programs) were made between 1962 and 1964 in the city of São Paulo by Rede Tupi and also by Rede Excelsior, both using NTSC. and between 1965 and 1966 on both Excelsior and TV Record/Rio for the MPB festivals and movie. Tests for the regular PAL-M transmissions began in 1970 with the Mexico's FIFA World Cup and the first official transmission was the coverage of the 12th Caxias do Sul Grape Festival on 19 February 1972. Limited color transmissions from 1973 to 1978. Full-time color transmissions was in 1976 when Rede Globo ended its black and white transmissions.
Bulgaria *	1969/1972/1976	BNT	SECAM	Test transmissions began in 1969. Regular color broadcasting began on 9 September 1972. Full color transmissions achieved by 1976.
Burkina Faso. - Republic of Upper Volta	1976	Volta Vision	SECAM	This country is now called Burkina Faso since 1984.
Burma *	1980	BBS	PAL, NTSC	This country goes by Myanmar since 1988. Color broadcasts began on 1 November 1980.
Cambodia * - People's Republic of Kampuchea	1986	National Television of Kampuchea	SECAM, PAL	Color transmissions started in 1986, switched to PAL from 1991. Last independent country in the world to receive color television. The reason why Cambodia started late was due to how after the Khmer Rouge took over in 1975, all television equipment was destroyed and after Vietnam invaded in 1979, resources were so sparse that Cambodia only had enough equipment to start monochrome TV in 1983.
Canada *	1966/1978	(CBC, SRC); CTV	NTSC	Tests began in 1964, and color television was officially launched in both English and French at 12:01 a.m. on July 1, 1966, at the beginning of Canada's 100th year as a nation. Color broadcasts from the United States had been available since the mid-1950s. A mandatory transition to color for all transmitters took place between 1969 and 1976 on all English and French channels. Full-time color was officially achieved in 1978 on most major-market TV flagship stations; there were a small number of transmitter chains (repeaters) and privately owned stations with low funding that continued to broadcast in black-and-white until at least the early 1980s, when color broadcasting equipment became more available and affordable.
Central African Republic	1985	TVCA	SECAM	The conversion to color broadcasts started in 1985.
Chile *	1978/1979	TVN; Televisión Universidad Católica de Chile (TVUC) (now Canal 13).	NTSC	The first exhibition of closed-circuit color television in Chile was carried out in March 1974 at the State Technical University (Universidad Técnica del Estado, now known as Universidad de Santiago) with equipment supplied by the Embassy of the United States which was then acquired by state-owned network TVN, which broadcast several games from the 1974 FIFA World Cup in color through closed-circuit systems, also transmitting the Viña del Mar Festival in color, but only for export between the 16th and 18th editions. The network eventually rolled out test colorcasts in late 1977 and early 1978. First news report in color was shown at Teletrece on 12 April 1978. Full-time color transmissions since mid-1979. Regional network Red Norte made several tests with the PAL system in 1976–77.
People's Republic of China *	1960	BTV Channel 2 (now CCTV-1, not BRTV).	NTSC (or possibly OSKM (Note: It also could have been the OSKM system, but all the references available say "American NTSC standard". At that time, it was only two years since the first black-and-white TV broadcasting in China at 1958 and only about a dozen cities had TV stations. Therefore, it cannot be ruled out that the standard of the experimental color broadcast was different from OSKM (e.g., it might not use YUV, but used YIQ like the original NTSC), or that it might have used System M, which was incompatible with System D, the de facto standard for black-and-white TVs of China at that time.))	Plans to introduce NTSC began in 1958, Internal tests launched in May 1960, and over-the-air experimental broadcasts were conducted in October 1960, but were canceled a few months later due to economic difficulties.
People's Republic of China *	1973/1977/1984 (Note: The exact time is undetermined, Xizang Television launched partial color broadcasting in October 1979 and Xinjiang Television in December 1979, but they may use black-and-white devices to broadcast recorded programmes from CCTV before 1984 and there are some black-and-white transmitters in used.)	BTV Channel 8 (now CCTV-2, not BRTV).	PAL	In 1969, the government began to urge the relevant research institutes to carry out research on color television. After that, in 1970, institutes throughout China started the "Color Television Collaborative Research Project" ("彩色电视攻关大会战"). Between 1970 and 1975, many experimental broadcasts were conducted, including PAL, SECAM, as well as a variety of self-developed standards (e.g., HXZ, (Note: one of standards developed by Tianjin team, bases on PAL, swaps U component's phase and V component's phase with each other by each line.) 1035-line line-sequential color system, (Note: one of standards developed by Chengdu team.) etc.). In 1971, PAL was set as a temporary standard. In August 1972, PAL inventor Walter Bruch traveled to Shanghai to give an academic lecture. Trial broadcasts since April 1973 and regular full-time color broadcasts since October 1973. Full-time color transmissions for all two channels, including Channel 2 (now CCTV-1) since 1977. Microwave relay color transmissions since 1975 and full-time color transmissions throughout all China using satellites DFH-2 2 (STTW-T2) were in 1984 (for some newly built CCTV relay stations in Xinjiang, Tibet Autonomous Region). Color broadcasts from Taiwan Kinmen relay transmitter (NTSC) (which had been available in some coastal areas of Fujian since 1978), Hong Kong (PAL) (which had been available in most parts of Guangdong since 1967) and the Soviet Union (SECAM) (which had been available in a few border areas of Heilongjiang since 1967).
Taiwan *. - Republic of China	1969/1975	CTV	NTSC	Full-time color transmissions since 1975. Color broadcasts from Fujian had been available in Matsu Islands since 1976, and Kinmen since 1982 in PAL.
Colombia *	1979/1981	Cenpro Televisión; Inravisión	NTSC	Test broadcasts in SECAM were held in 1966. Tests for the regular transmissions began in 1971 with the coverage of that year's Pan American Games held in Cali. In October 1973, the programadora Cenpro Televisión made a color broadcast during an education seminar with Japanese-made equipment. Color broadcasts from Panama and Venezuela had been available since 1972, while telecasts from Ecuador had been available beginning in 1973. In 1974, the inauguration of West Germany's FIFA World Cup was shown in color in closed circuit at two colosseums in Bogota and Cali. Regular color transmissions since Saturday, 1 December 1979. Full-time color transmissions since 1981.
DR Congo * - Zaire	1975/1980	Télé-Zaïre	SECAM	In preparation for color broadcasts, Télé-Zaïre ordered $1.6 million in equipment and services from RCA.
Congo. - Congo (Brazzaville)	1974/1978	Télé Congo	SECAM	Early color broadcasts came in 1970. Color broadcasts were available from Democratic Republic of the Congo since 1974, But full color broadcasts were not achieved until the late 1970s.
Costa Rica *	1969/1974	Televictoria; Telecentro; TICA-TV	NTSC	Full-time color broadcasts since 1974.
Croatia *. - SR Croatia, SFRJ, Yugoslavia	1968/1970/1975	Radiotelevizija Zagreb (now HRT 1).	PAL	Tests began in 1966. The first program was broadcast to the public in 1968 and became full-time by 1975.
Cuba *	1958/1975/1986	Tele-Color, S.A. Tele Rebelde (1975)	NTSC	Started in 1958 as the second country in the world to have color telecasts in Havana's channel 4. Ended in 1959 as a result of the Cuban Revolution under Fidel Castro; returned in 1975 this time starting with Tele Rebelde and Havana's channel 2 (which would later become part of Tele Rebelde in April 1979), to broadcast the 1st Congress of the Communist Party of Cuba. Limited-time color broadcasts from 1975 to 1986. Full-time color broadcasts since 1985.
Cyprus *	1976	CyBC	SECAM	Regular broadcast in Cyprus since 1976.
Northern Cyprus *	1979	BRT	PAL	Color broadcasts in Northern Cyprus started on 1 July 1979.
Czech Republic *. - Czech Socialist Republic	1973/1975/1980	ČST	SECAM, PAL	The first color program was on 14 February 1970. Regular color broadcasts started on 9 May 1973, on second channel and on 9 May 1975, on first channel. Limited-time color transitions from 1973 to 1980. Full color transition since 1980, switched to PAL broadcasting in 1993. ČST started color experiments in the late 1960s for PAL. After the Soviet invasion in 1968, SECAM was chosen for broadcasting, but not for production. Television studios worked in PAL and then it was transcoded for SECAM broadcasting until 1993. Color telecasts from East Germany were available since 1969.
Denmark *	1968/1970/1978	Danmarks Radio	PAL	First introduced for the 1968 Winter Olympics in Grenoble, France. The national broadcaster's programming transitioned to color throughout 1969 and "color tests" were officially ended on Wednesday, 1 April 1970. Color broadcasts had been available from West Germany since 1967.
Djibouti. - French Territory of the Afars and the Issas	1974/1977	RTD	SECAM	The country became independent in 1977.
Dominican Republic	1969/1975	Color Visión	NTSC	
Ecuador *	1973/1974/1980	Ecuavisa; Teleamazonas	NTSC	Teleamazonas was founded in 1973, broadcasting several color programs from its start. Ecuavisa made its own color test broadcasts beginning in June of that year, but was limited to imported shows. However, these would only be officially authorized in 1980, when full-time transmission began.
Egypt *	1973	ETV	PAL	
Equatorial Guinea	1976/1981	TVGE	SECAM	Color broadcasts were available in Gabon since 1973.
El Salvador *	1973	Canal 4 (Part-time); Canal 6 (Full-time); Currently, both channels are part of TCS since 1985.	NTSC	First color transmissions have available from Guatemala in the west of the country since 1970. The first broadcast in color was on Saturday, 3 March 1973 at 8:30 pm on Canal 4 using the NTSC system, provided by RCA color cameras with the program "La Danza de los Colones", the channel was later adopted full-color transmissions during the 1974 FIFA World Cup in West Germany. Canal 6 returned as the first full-color service transmission on 6 April, as YSWA-TV. Later that decade, Canal 2 and Televisión Educativa (Channels 8 and 10) adopted full-time color service.
Estonia *. - Estonian SSR	1967/1972/1981	ETV	SECAM, PAL	First color broadcasts came from Moscow; first local color program was transmitted on Saturday, 30 December 1972. Limited-time color TV broadcasts from 1973 to 1981. Full-time color TV broadcasts since July 1981. Transitioned from SECAM to PAL 1992–1999.
Ethiopia *	1979/1984	EBC	SECAM	Test colour broadcasts had been occurring since 1979 with it becoming regular by 1984.
Finland *	1969/1976	YLE; MTV	PAL	The first broadcast in color was the President Urho Kekkonen's New Year speech in 1969, and color television licenses were introduced the same year. Color was introduced gradually; most programs were in color by the end of the 1970s. Some news broadcasts remained in black-and-white until May 1979. MTV's first color broadcast was in 1970, with color production beginning in 1976.
France *	1967/1975/1983	RTF, then ORTF	SECAM	Tested from 1961 to 1966 and official national introduction on La deuxième chaîne ORTF at 2:15pm (14:15) on Sunday, 1 October 1967. The first national channel (later renamed TF1) remained in black and white for years, due to being transmitted in the older high-definition 819-line standard: its transition to color 625-line began on Saturday, 20 December 1975 with full-time color transmissions since 1977, and its full nationwide color coverage was only achieved on 19 July 1983, when Aquitaine become the last France region to complete transition into TF1 full-time color TV broadcasting.
Gabon	1975	RTG	SECAM	Color television was implanted on 30 December 1975 by then President Omar Bongo for his 40th birthday.
Georgia *. Georgian SSR	1968/1984	GPB	SECAM	Georgia started to air color broadcasts on 7 November 1968 in Tbilisi, Yet full time color broadcasting was not achieved throughout the country, including sporadic areas until circa 1976 and 1984.
East Germany	1969/1976	DFF	SECAM	Introduced on Friday, 9 October 1969, on the new second television channel launched for that purpose with a symbolic launch button pressed by Walter Ulbricht on the occasion of the 20th anniversary of the German Democratic Republic on Tuesday, 7 October. The television tower in East Berlin was also opened that day. Switchover on 31 December 1991, because of German reunification. Color broadcasts from West Germany had been available since 1967.
West Germany	1967/1970/1973	ARD; ZDF	PAL	First country in Europe to introduce color on two television channels simultaneously, at 9:30am on Friday, 25 August 1967, with a symbolic launch button pressed by Willy Brandt on the International Radio and Television Fair in West Berlin. Full-time color service began in 1970. Some news bulletins (such as Tagesschau and Heute) still retained in B&W until October 1973.
Ghana *	1985	GTV	PAL	Last country in Africa to introduce color television.
Gibraltar *	1980	GBC	PAL	Color broadcasts have been available from Spain and Morocco since 1972.
Greece *	1974/1977/1979/1981	ERT	SECAM, PAL	Experimental color broadcasts began at the 1974 World Cup. Test color broadcasts began in 1977. Partial color broadcasts started from 1979 to 1981. Full color transmissions since 1981. ERT switched to PAL in 1992.
Greenland *	1984/1987	KNR	NTSC, PAL	Color broadcasts from Canada had been available since 1966, but were NTSC. Private transmitters were built to receive television signals from Canada long before Greenland had their native television service which came into broadcast in 1982. Full-time color service came in 1984, remote areas continued to broadcast in black and white until c. 1987–1990.
Guadeloupe *	1972	RFO (Guadeloupe 1ère)	SECAM	
Guinea	1977/1979	RTG	PAL	Color broadcasts from the Ivory Coast had been available since 1976, but were SECAM.
Guatemala *	1970	RTG	NTSC	First Central American country to introduce color television; color broadcasts available from Mexico since 1967.
Guam	1970	KUAM-TV	NTSC	KUAM was a primary NBC affiliate that also carried some programming from ABC and CBS.
Guyana *	1979	GBC	NTSC	
Haiti *	1971	Télé Haïti	NTSC	
Honduras *	1973	Canal 3	NTSC	
Hong Kong * - British Hong Kong	1967/1969/1971/1975	TVB; RTV	PAL	The first country in Greater China to introduce color television in 1967. The first experimental color broadcast was at the 1969 Hong Kong Festival. TVB introduced color broadcasts in 1971 and RTV in 1973. Full-time color broadcasts since 1975.
Hungary *	1969/1971/1980	Magyar Televízió	SECAM, PAL	The first experimental color test was in 1967, then regular tests began two years later in 1969, however, there was not actual regular color TV broadcasting until 1971 and full-time color broadcasting was 1980, when news programs such as Híradó fully switched to color, which begin filming in this in 1975.
Iceland *	1973/1975/1978	RÚV (Sjónvarpið)	PAL	Full-time color broadcasts since 1975 to 1978.
India *	1978/1982/1986	Doordarshan	PAL	In 1978, India color tests started, but officially launched in 1982 India Independence Day, but full-color did not exist until 1986.
Indonesia *	1977/1979	TVRI	PAL	Broadcasting began in 1977, with it becoming full-time on 1 September 1979
Iran *	1974/1976/1978	NIRT	PAL	Although NIRT had the facilities to broadcast in color around 1974 for the Asian Games, Color broadcasts did not begin until 1975, although reception was largely confined to affluent people who are able to afford colour sets. Regular colour broadcasts were introduced in 1976. Full broadcasts in colour were delayed until 1978, on account of the ability of local manufacturers to meet the demand for colour sets. Iran had switched to SECAM in February 1977 and used it until 1998, when they switched to PAL.
Iraq *	1968/1976	RTI	SECAM	First Muslim country to introduce color television.
Ireland *	1968/1971/1978	RTÉ	PAL	First color broadcast was in 1968, however, an error in standards conversion may have transmitted the 1968 Wimbledon Men's Finals in color. First original color produced programme was John Hume's Derry shown under the 7 Days banner, first transmitted in 1969. First color outside broadcast was the Eurovision Song Contest 1971 held in Dublin on Saturday, 3 April 1971. Full-time color broadcasting was available from November 2, 1978, with the launch of RTÉ 2.
Israel *	1977/1979/1984	IBA; IETV	PAL	Introduced for the coverage of the Egyptian president's visit to Israel in November 1977, then reintroduced for the Eurovision Song Contest 1979 in Jerusalem on Saturday, 31 March 1979. Gradual transition to full-time color transmissions from 1982 to 1984. Full-time color transmissions since 16 February 1983. Color broadcasts had been available from Lebanon since 1967 and Egypt since 1973 and Jordan since 1974. Since color TVs were considered more expensive, the government ordered removing the color signals, in the name of public equality. However, Engineers developed a device that restores the colors from programs that were originally shot in color and thousands of such devices were sold. (see anti-Mehikon on Hebrew Wiki) Major television networks in Israel have been filming programs in color for foreign audiences since at least 1974.
Italy *	1972/1977	RAI	PAL	Introduction temporarily stalled by political turmoil. Color broadcasts from France (SECAM) had been available since 1967, from Austria (PAL) since 1969 and from Yugoslavia (PAL) since 1971. Privately operated transmitter chains made these signals available as far as Rome. The first color test was in 1972 Summer Olympics Games. The Jeux sans frontières began to be broadcast in color in 1973. Full-time color transmissions started on Tuesday, 1 February 1977.
Ivory Coast *	1973	RTI	SECAM	Introduced in a phase of reforms at the broadcaster.
Jamaica *	1975/1978	JBC	NTSC	Color broadcasts have been available from Haiti since 1971. Full time color in 1978.
Japan *	1960/1971/1977	NHK; NTV; KRT (now TBS); YTV; ABC	NTSC	The first Asian country to introduce color television, beginning telecasts on Saturday, 1960 September 10, through the NHK, NTV, KRT (now TBS) and their Osaka affiliates, with NHK's Tokyo station and NTV having started test broadcasts since 1957 December 28 and domestic made color TVs beginning to be made the same year. Full-time color service introduced in 1971, when Fukushima Central Television introduced color TV, and when NHK General TV ended its black and white transmissions, TBS and NTV ended its black and white transmissions in 1972, although some commercials was continued to filming in B&W until 1975. However, there were still very few select programs on NHK Educational TV that were in Black and White until October 1977. Use the NTSC-J system.
Jordan *	1974	JTV	PAL	
Kazakhstan *. - Kazakh SSR	1969/1977/1981	Kazakhstan	SECAM, PAL	Color television began only in Almaty in 1969 at first, but eventually, color television became full time in the entire country in January 1981.
Kenya *	1978	KBC	PAL	
North Korea *	1974/1977/1991	KCTV	PAL	Regular TV transmissions on KCTV started in July 1974 and full-time since September 1977. However, Ryongnamsan Television switched to color TV on 10 October 1991, making Ryongnamsan TV the last recorded TV channel to switch to color in the world and also making North Korea the last country to finish the transition to color television, while already having it on some TV channels in the process.
South Korea *	1975/1980/1981	KBS; MBC	NTSC	Regular test color broadcasts began in the late 1970s, with the first color television sets being built in 1975. Regular color broadcasts began in 1980, with full-time color broadcasts beginning in 1981. Color broadcasts have been available from Japan since 1960, North Korea since 1974 and American Forces Network stations in South Korea since 1977.
Kosovo *. - SAP Kosovo	1982	RTP	PAL	
Kuwait *	1974	KTV	PAL	
Kyrgyzstan *. - Kirghiz SSR	1974/1981	KTRK	SECAM	Color broadcasting started in 1974 and has been full time since 1981.
Latvia *. - Latvian SSR	1968/1974	LTV	SECAM, PAL	First color broadcasts came from Moscow. First local color program was transmitted on Monday, 28 January 1974. Switched from SECAM to PAL on 2 February 1998.
Lebanon *	1967/1975	CLT (now Télé Liban)	SECAM	In 1967, CLT became the third television station in the world after the Soviet Union and France to broadcast in color utilizing the French SECAM technology. Full-color broadcasts have been since 1975.
Liberia *	1975	LBS	PAL	
Libya *	1976	Al-Libyah TV	PAL	
Lithuania *. - Lithuanian SSR	1968/1975	LRT	SECAM, PAL	Color broadcasting started on 26 February 1975. Used SECAM from 1968 to 1996. PAL has been in use since 1997.
Luxembourg *	1967/1972	Compagnie Luxembourgeoise de Télédiffusion	PAL, SECAM	The then only channel for audiences in Luxembourg, France and Belgium originally used the French/Belgian 819-line black and white standard. After Belgium and France opted for different color systems, Luxembourg broadcast two versions of the same channel. All later RTL channels aimed at French, German and Dutch-speaking audiences in Europe adopted the standards of their target markets. Full color telecasts began in 1972.
North Macedonia *. - SR Macedonia	1971/1975/1978	Televizija Skopje (now MRT 1).	PAL	Test transmissions from Serbia in December 1971, domestic color programs started in 1975, with it being full time before 1978, when Macedonia's second channel came along.
Madagascar *.	1977	MBS	SECAM	
Malaysia *	1978/1980/1982	RTM	PAL	Test transmissions for colour TV began in early January 1978. TV1 started broadcasting in colour since December 1978 in Peninsular Malaysia and 1980 in Sabah and Sarawak. TV2 followed on 7 May 1979.
Maldives	1978/1984	TVM	PAL	Color broadcasts had been available from India and Sri Lanka since 1982.
Mali *	1984	ORTM	SECAM	
Malta *	1981	TVM	PAL	Color broadcasts from Italy had been available since the late 70s. Regular color transmissions began on TVM on 8 July 1981.
Martinique *	1969	RFO (Martinique 1ère)	SECAM	
Mauritania *	1984	TV de Mauritanie	SECAM	
Mauritius *	1973/1975/1978	MBC	SECAM	Color television arrived on a full-time schedule in 1978.
Mexico *	1963/1968/1970	Canal 5 Telesistema Mexicano (now Televisa).	NTSC	Launched Saturday, 8 February 1963, with the program Paraiso Infantil. Color had been available previously in a few border cities from the United States, on a limited basis. Regular color transmissions started with the 1968 Summer Olympics Games, with full service by late 1970. Before its adoption of NTSC, Mexico had its own system of color television, invented by Guillermo González, which was used for the 1964 Summer Olympics Games.
Moldova *. - Moldavian SSR	1974/1981	Teleradio-Moldova	SECAM, PAL	First transmissions from Russia in 1967. Regular color broadcasting since 1974 and full time in 1981.
Monaco *	1973	TMC	PAL, SECAM	Color broadcasts from France had been available since 1967; the first color broadcasts from Monaco began in December 1973 on the national TV channel, TMC.
Mongolia *	1976/1981/1988	MNB	SECAM, PAL	The first color program was shown in 1976. Regular color broadcasting began in 1981, but full-time color broadcasting was not achieved until December 1988.
Montenegro *. - SR Montenegro	1974	Radiotelevizija Titograd (now TVCG 1)	PAL	
Morocco *	1972/1974	RTM	SECAM	First test transmission was in 1972. Full color broadcasting did not arrive until 1974.
Mozambique *	1984	TVM	PAL	
Netherlands *	1967	NPO	PAL	Introduced on both national channels (Nederland 1 and Nederland 2) on Thursday, 21 September 1967, opened by Leo de Block, at the Firato '67 exhibition.
Netherlands Antilles	1973	TeleCuraçao	NTSC	
New Caledonia	1972	RFO (France Ô - Nouvelle Calédonie)	SECAM	New Caledonia began to broadcast in color for the 1972 Summer Olympics Games, full color broadcasts became official in 1978.
New Zealand *	1973/1975	NZBC	PAL	Introduced on 31 October 1973, as part of preparations for the 1974 British Commonwealth Games, held in Christchurch in February 1974. Colour was initially available in Auckland, Wellington and Christchurch, with other areas added as transmitters were upgraded. Full-time colour broadcasting started 1 April 1975 coinciding with the move to the new Avalon studios and launch of Television One.
Nicaragua *	1973	Televicentro Canal 2	NTSC	
Niger *	1979	Télé Sahel	SECAM	Color broadcasts had been available from Nigeria from 1974, but were PAL.
Nigeria *	1974	WNTV (now called the NTA)	PAL	
Norway *	1972/1976	NRK	PAL	Experimental color broadcasts introduced for the 1968 Winter Olympics in Grenoble, France. Regular test transmissions from Saturday, 1 January 1972. Full-time color broadcasts since Wednesday, 1 January 1975. Although monochrome commercials continued to be made until 1976. Color broadcasts had been available from Sweden since 1970, in parts of Norway and Finland since 1969.
Oman *	1975	Oman TV	PAL	Introduced in the New Year's Day in 1975. Color broadcasts has been available from Saudi Arabia since 1973 and United Arab Emirates from 1974.
Pakistan *	1976/1982	PTV	PAL	Full-time color transmissions since 1982.
Panama *	1972	TVN	NTSC	
Paraguay *	1978/1979/1980	Canal 9 Canal 7	PAL	First color broadcasts on Paraguay started in 1978 for World Cup at the time, full-time broadcasts were brought around 1979–1980. Uses the PAL-N system.
Peru *	1967/1978/1980	TV Perú; América Televisión; Panamericana Televisión	NTSC	First color test transmission was done in 1967 by Panamericana Televisión for a soap opera but for economic and political reasons the project was canceled. Color broadcasts from Ecuador had been available since 1973. Channel 7 made test broadcasts with their own content since 1974, using the three existing standards (NTSC, PAL, and SECAM), later mostly using NTSC since late-1976/1977. In Thursday 17 January 1978, the Peruvian government approved the NTSC color television standard and official broadcasts were authorised. The first official color broadcast was the 20th anniversary of Lima's Channel 7 on 17 January 1978, the same day the Peruvian government approved color broadcasts. The coverage of the 1978 election was probably the first official color broadcast in the 2 main networks (América Televisión and Panamericana Televisión). América Televisión and Panamericana Televisión began their regular color broadcasting with the broadcast of the 1978 Argentina's FIFA World Cup; however, most main programming still aired in black-and-white until April 1980, after the now-private stations announced their new full-color programming in February 1980. Also, color receivers were not widely available before late 1979 due to import restrictions. Transition completed on 1 October 1980.
Philippines	1966/1969/1971	ABS-CBN; Kanlaon Broadcasting System (later RPN)	NTSC	First color test transmission was in 1963. Commercial launch on June 12, 1966, using RCA color from 1:00 to 3:00 pm. A special newscast was broadcast in color when Neil Armstrong landed on the Moon. Full-time color transmissions began in 1971 when color sets became more widespread in the Manila area and suburbs within RBS 7 and ABC 5. KBS-9 was the first Philippine TV station to launch in color (1969), funded in part by ABS-CBN. It was the second Asian country to broadcast in color.
Poland *	1971/1976	TVP	SECAM, PAL	First time color program was broadcast on 16 March 1971 & regular broadcasting began on 6 December 1971, for 6th PUWP congress. The 1972 Olympic Games in Munich used color in SECAM, but full-time color broadcastings was not achieved until 1976. Transitioned to PAL on 1 January 1994, for all TVP channels except for TVP1 which transitioned on 1 January 1995.
Portugal *	1979/1980/1982	RTP	PAL	First experimental broadcasts for the coverage of the 1976 election and the 1976 Summer Olympics in Montreal. Formally introduced hosting the Heat 8 of season 15 of Jeux sans frontières on 5 September 1979; color broadcasts from Spain available since 1972. Full-color transmissions started 7 March 1980 (with Festival da Canção), but Azores still had some black and white transmissions until 1982
Puerto Rico *	1966	WAPA-TV	NTSC	
Qatar *	1973	QBS	PAL	Color broadcasts from Bahrain had been available since 1972.
Réunion	1972	RFO (1ère Réunion)	SECAM	Introduced for the 1972 Olympic Games in Munich.
Romania *	1981/1983/1985/1990	TVR	PAL	Test color broadcasting began in 1981. Introduced for the 39th anniversary of King Michael's Coup on 23 August 1983 without the Ceaușescu family being notified. Unlike the other Warsaw Pact countries, Romania chose to adopt PAL rather than SECAM. Regular color broadcasting began in 1985, but full-time color broadcasts introduced between 1986 and 1990. The last European country to finish transition to color television. Color TV broadcasts was available from USSR since 1967, from Hungary and Yugoslavia since 1971, from Bulgaria since 1972 and from Czechoslovakia since 1973, but were in SECAM.
Russia *. - Russian Soviet Federative Socialist Republic	1967/1973/1977	Soviet Central Television (now Channel One).	OSKM, SECAM	Test color broadcasting started in Moscow as early as 14 January 1960 using the OSKM system (based on NTSC, which was adapted to the European 625 lines standard, using a 4.43 MHz color subcarrier) from the Moscow Experimental TV Studio at Shabolovka street, but lasted only a few months as this system was rejected. Only about 4000 television sets were built for this system (Raduga, Temp 22, Izumrud 201/203). SECAM broadcasting was introduced specifically for the 50th Golden Jubilee Anniversary of the October Revolution in 1967. The Song of the Year festival and the New Year's address by the leader of the USSR began to be filmed in color in 1973. Full-time colorcasts began between 1977 and 1978, but however, there were small stations at the edge of the country in places such as Siberia finishing the switch in 1987. Some parts of the USSR received color from Alaska since 1966 in some circumstances when signals were not jammed in some parts and were received by contraband receivers to pick up signals.
Saint Kitts and Nevis. - Saint Christopher, Nevis and Anguilla	1981	ZIZ-TV	NTSC	This former British colony is the current Saint Kitts and Nevis. Color broadcasts have been available from Guadeloupe since 1972, but were SECAM. Full-color broadcast since 1981.
Saint Pierre and Miquelon *	1967	RFO (1ère SPM TV; Previously known as ORTF)	SECAM	Color transmissions had been available from Newfoundland and Labrador since 1967, but were NTSC. There are transmitters in SPM that can carry a signal from Newfoundland and Labrador which converts it to SECAM from NTSC and in some cases, In Fortune, Newfoundland, 1ère is converted to NTSC by a transmitter that is placed there.
Saudi Arabia *	1973	SAGTS	SECAM	
Senegal *	1975	RTS	SECAM	
Serbia *. - SR Serbia	1971/1979	Televizija Beograd (now RTS1).	PAL	Introduced on the launch of the second TVB channel (TVB 2) on New Year's Eve of 1971, as it was the first Yugoslav channel to start in color. From the late 1970s, TVB 1 switched to color, thus making all channels broadcast in color. (both TVB 1 and TVB 2, as they were only the channels available in that time) Full-time color broadcasts in SR Serbia since 25 May 1979, when news programs such as Dnevnik fully switched to color. Color broadcasts had been available from Italy since 1972.
Sierra Leone *	1978	SLBS	PAL	
Singapore *	1974/1975/1977	Radio Television Singapore (RTS)	PAL	Test transmissions began on 2 May 1974 with imported series such as The Mary Tyler Moore Show and was officially introduced on 8 July for the 1974 World Cup Final. The first local programme in colour was the 1974 National Day Parade. Newsreels and other programmes were converted on 11 November 1974. Full-time color broadcasts began on 1 November 1975 when the new studio opened; the news operation was converted at the same time.
Slovakia *. - Slovak Socialist Republic.	1970/1973/1980	ČST	SECAM, PAL	First color transmission in 1970 during World Ski Championship which was broadcast in PAL. Adopted SECAM in 1973 with full-color transition in 1980. Switched to PAL from 1993.
Slovenia *. - SR Slovenia	1966/1972/1978	Radiotelevizija Ljubljana (now TV Slovenija 1)	PAL	The first test color broadcasts were in 1966, with it becoming regular by 1972 and finally full-time in 1978, when the news programs switched to color.
Spain *	1972/1973/1978	TVE	PAL	Color broadcasts had been available from France since 1967, but were SECAM. The Eurovision Song Contest 1969 in Madrid was produced in color, but it was televised in black and white to the local audience. First color tests were carried out in 1972. Regular color broadcasts were introduced between 1973 and 1977, although monochrome commercials continued to be made until 1978.
Sudan *	1976	Sudan TV	PAL	
Suriname *	1977	STVS	NTSC	
Sweden *	1969/1970/1975	Sveriges Radio TV	PAL	Test transmissions started on Wednesday, 16 December 1969. Regular color service and color license fee introduced on Wednesday, 1 April 1970. Full-time color broadcasts since 1975.
Switzerland *	1968	SBC	PAL	Switzerland used PAL to broadcast the 1968 Olympic Games in Mexico City, color transmissions had been available from France and West Germany since 1967.
Syria *	1978/1980	STV	PAL	Experimental broadcasts began in 1978, transitioning to regular broadcasts in 1980.
Tanzania *	1971/1973	ZTV	PAL	Test color broadcasting in Tanzania began in 1971, but color broadcasting in Tanzania officially started in 1973. ITV launched in 1994 and ZTV closed in 1994.
Tajikistan *. - Tajik SSR	1975/1982	TVT	SECAM	Color broadcasting started on 25 January 1975, initially, since the equipment had not arrived to the station in Dushanbe yet, color programming was limited to programs from outside the Tajik SSR; then full-time broadcasting throughout the country by 1982.
Thailand *	1967/1975	Channel 7	PAL	Although television in Thailand originally employed a 525-line screen (System M, US standard at the time), the country opted for PAL color, which necessitated a conversion to system B (625 lines), starting with Channel 7 in November 1967 to broadcast Miss Thailand 1967. Regional stations converted between 1972 and 1975. All channel transmission to color since 1975 to broadcast 1975 SEAP Games.
Togo	1979/1981	TVT	SECAM	Tests began around 1979, with regular color service in 1981.
Trinidad and Tobago *	1977	TTT	NTSC	
Tunisia *	1972	RTT	SECAM	
Turkey *	1980/1984	TRT	PAL	The first color TV sets were manufactured in factories in Turkey in 1976. Test transmissions started with the New Year's Eve celebrations on 31 December 1980 - 1 January 1981; full color television did not start until 1 July 1984. Color broadcasts from Greece had been available since 1976 and Bulgaria since at least 1969.
Turkmenistan * - Turkmen SSR	1974	Turkmen Television	SECAM	Talks, plans and minor tests began from Moscow in 1967. First Central Asian country to introduce color television. Regular color broadcasting then started around 1974, but full-time color broadcasting was not until later.
Uganda *	1975	UTV	PAL	
Ukraine *. - Ukrainian SSR	1967/1969/1976	UT-1	SECAM, PAL	First transmission came from Moscow in 1967, Ukraine uses SECAM in for the 1968 Olympic Games in Mexico City. Local color broadcasts began in 1969, and full time since 1976.
United Arab Emirates	1974	UAE-TV	PAL	
United Kingdom *	1967/1969/1976/1985	BBC2 (1967); BBC1 and ITV (1969)	PAL	First European country to receive color television. First experimental 405 line broadcasts using a variation of the NTSC system begin in 1955 and later showcased during the 1961 National Radio Show at Earls Court as an experiment. In early 1966, the PAL system was adopted and introduced on BBC2 for Wimbledon coverage on Saturday, 1 July 1967. Some British television programmes, however, had been produced in color even before the introduction of color television in 1967, for the purpose of sales to American, Canadian and Filipino networks. Full-time color broadcasts on BBC1 and the ITV network started on 15 November 1969. BBC Schools programming did not begin color broadcasting until 1974 and full nationwide color broadcasting was achieved in 1976, when BBC East (Norwich) became the last region to adopt color for regional broadcasts and locally produced programmes. Monochrome 405-line Televisions ended transmissions in January 1985, thus ending black-and-white television in the UK permanently.
United States *	1950	CBS	FSC	Field-sequential color system (FSC); experimental; ended 1951. The first country with black-and-white transmission to introduce color television.
United States *	1953/1972/1986	NBC; CBS	NTSC	Dot sequential system. The U.S. began a gradual transition to color in late 1953. The first color TV sets were very expensive and the audience for color was accordingly very small, so only specials and a handful of regularly scheduled shows aired in color during the 1950s. Market penetration slowly increased as more affordable sets and more color programming became available. A tipping-point came in 1965, when the commercial networks first aired most of their prime-time shows in color. By the end of 1966, prime-time was all color; an ever dwindling number of daytime, local, and educational programs continued in black-and-white for a few more years. The percentage of color TV users crossed the 50% mark by 1972, and the last station to introduce color was WQEX-TV (a low-power repeater of WQED-TV), in Pittsburgh, Pennsylvania, in 1986.
Uruguay *	1980/1981/1984	CXB-10	PAL	Introduced for the 1980 Mundialito but locally broadcast in black and white. The first color broadcast held locally was in mid-1978 by Río Uruguay Televisión, who began its conversion to color broadcasting in June 1980, between 9pm and 10pm. Local color broadcasting started on 25 August 1981 when Canal 10 brought regular color broadcasting (Red Uruguaya de Televisión, which brought color television to inland Uruguay, started on the same day), Montecarlo TV started to broadcast some Formula One editions in colour by late 1980-mid 1981, but full time color broadcasts was not achieved until around 1984. Uses PAL-N system.
Uzbekistan *. Uzbek SSR	1971/1978/1984	MTRK	SECAM	Experimental color broadcasts in 1971, and then, Uzbekistan started regular Color TV broadcasts in 1978. Full-time color broadcasting since 1984.
Venezuela *	1970/1979/1980	RCTV; Venevision	NTSC	The first color transmission took place in 1970 with that year's FIFA World Cup aired by Radio Caracas Televisión (RCTV). In 1972, Venezolana de Televisión broadcast Renny Ottolina's documentary Churun Meru in color through a closed-circuit system installed in a number of hotels. That year, both RCTV and Venevisión began the production of color programs, mostly for foreign sales, but also for the transmission of special events and some programs. In 1974, President Carlos Andrés Pérez banned the transmission of color programs until all Venezuelans could acquire any television with color reception capacity. However, by 1975 both private broadcasters had color-ready technical facilities and beginning in June 1978 several programs were clandestinely broadcast in color. On 1 December 1979, public broadcaster Televisora Nacional aired the country's first officially-authorized color telecast, followed just one week later on 8 December with the broadcast of the OTI Festival 1979, produced by the four channels; with President Luis Herrera Campíns finally decreeing permission for color television on 1 June 1980, already full-time on all television stations.
Vietnam *	1977/1986/1987	VNTV	SECAM, PAL	Test color transmissions began in Ho Chi Minh City, South Vietnam in 1976. The first color television program aired during Tết of 1977 with further testing in 1978 by VTV. Color televisions were available only in big cities until 1 August 1986. The last station to switch to color TV was Ho Chi Minh City Television which switched on 24 August 1987 after a fire destroyed the entire television center the previous day. Switched to PAL from 1990.
U.S. Virgin Islands	1968	WBNB-TV	NTSC	WBNB was a CBS affiliate whose first color broadcasts took place during the 1968 Olympic Games in Mexico City. This station was destroyed by Hurricane Hugo on September 18, 1989.
South Yemen	1981	Aden TV	PAL	On 8 March 1981, South Yemen started color TV. Became the united Yemen's channel 2 after reunification in 1990.
Zambia *	1977	ZNBC	PAL	
Zimbabwe *	1982/1984	ZBC	PAL	In October 1982, Zimbabwe began experimental broadcasts. Color broadcasts have been available from Zambia since 1977 and South Africa since 1976. Full-time color broadcast in 1984.

== List of countries and territories that never had black and white television ==
Countries and territories that never had black and white television (i.e., their first broadcasts were in color) are not included in the table above.

- Afghanistan
- Åland Islands
- Andorra
- Antigua and Barbuda
- Bahrain
- Bhutan
- Bonaire
- Botswana (Bechuanaland)
- British Virgin Islands
- Brunei
- Cameroon
- Cape Verde
- Cayman Islands
- Chad
- Christmas Island
- Cocos (Keeling) Islands
- Collectivity of Saint Martin
- Comoros
- Cook Islands
- Dominica
- Eritrea
- Eswatini (Swaziland)
- Falkland Islands
- Faroe Islands
- Federated States of Micronesia
- Fiji
- Gambia
- Grenada
- Guinea-Bissau
- Kiribati
- Laos
- Lesotho
- Liechtenstein
- Macau
- Malawi (Nyasaland)
- Marshall Islands
- Mayotte
- Montserrat
- Namibia (South West Africa)
- Nauru
- Nepal
- Niue
- Norfolk Island
- Palestine
- Palau
- Papua New Guinea
- Pitcairn Islands
- Rwanda
- Sahrawi Arab Democratic Republic
- Saint Barthélemy
- Saint Helena
- Saint Lucia
- Saint Vincent and the Grenadines
- Samoa
- São Tomé and Príncipe
- San Marino
- Seychelles
- Sint Maarten
- Sint Eustatius
- Solomon Islands
- Somalia
- Somaliland
- South Africa
- South Ossetia
- South Sudan
- Sri Lanka (Ceylon)
- Tanzania (Tanganyika)
- Timor-Leste
- Tokelau
- Tonga
- Turks and Caicos Islands
- Tuvalu
- Vanuatu
- Vatican City
- Wallis and Futuna
- Yemen (North Yemen)

== List by subdivisions within each nation ==
=== Australia ===
- Australian Capital Territory - 1975
- Queensland - 1975
- Tasmania - 1975
- New South Wales - 1975
- Victoria - 1976
- Northern Territory - 1978

=== Belgium ===
- Wallonia - 1971
- Brussels - 1971

=== Brazil ===
- Rio de Janeiro - 1972
- Amazonas - 1972/1975
- Rio Grande do Sul - 1972/1979
- São Paulo - 1972
- Bahia - 1973
- Minas Gerais - 1973
- Maranhão - 1973
- Mato Grosso do Sul - 1974
- Mato Grosso - 1974
- Acre - 1975
- Amapá - 1975
- Ceará - 1975
- Paraná - 1975
- Roraima - 1975
- Alagoas - 1975/1978
- Espírito Santo - 1976
- Goiás - 1976
- Piauí - 1976
- Rondônia - 1976
- Tocantins - 1976
- Sergipe - 1977
- Paraíba - 1977
- Pernambuco - 1977
- Pará - 1977
- Rio Grande do Norte - 1978
- Santa Catarina - 1978

=== Canada ===
- Alberta - 1966
- British Columbia - 1966
- Manitoba - 1966
- Ontario - 1966
- Quebec - 1966
- Saskatchewan - 1966
- Newfoundland and Labrador - 1967
- New Brunswick - 1968
- Nova Scotia - 1968
- Prince Edward Island - 1969
- Yukon - 1971
- Northwest Territories - 1972
- Nunavut - 1972

=== China ===
- Beijing - 1973
- Shanghai - 1974
- Guangdong - 1976
- Jilin - 1977
- Fujian - 1978
- Hainan - 1978
- Tibet - 1979
- Inner Mongolia - 1979
- Ningxia - 1980
- Anhui - 1981
- Chongqing - 1981
- Gansu - 1981
- Heilionjiang - 1981
- Hunan - 1981
- Jiangxi - 1981
- Shandong - 1981
- Shanxi - 1981
- Xinjiang - 1982
- Henan - 1983
- Qinghai - 1984

=== France ===
- Normandy - 1967
- Aquitaine - 1968
- Bas-Rhin - 1968
- Brittany - 1968
- Burgundy - 1968
- Lorraine - 1968
- Rhône-Alpes - 1968
- French Polynesia - 1972
- French Guiana - 1974

=== Italy ===
- Lazio - 1972
- Naples - 1972
- Rome - 1972
- Turin - 1972
- Friuli-Venezia Giulia - 1975
- Sicily - 1976
- Veneto - 1977

=== Japan ===
- Osaka - 1960
- Tokyo - 1960
- Hiroshima - 1962
- Aichi - 1964
- Ehime - 1964
- Nagano - 1964
- Niigata - 1964
- Akita - 1966
- Aomori - 1966
- Nara - 1967
- Saitama - 1967
- Hokkaido - 1968
- Kagawa - 1968
- Okinawa - 1968
- Kumamoto - 1969
- Mie - 1969

=== Spain ===
- Andalusia - 1972
- Basque Country - 1972
- Madrid - 1972
- Catalonia - 1973
- Asturias - 1975
- Galicia - 1975
- Balearic Islands - 1976
- Navarra - 1976
- Valencian Community - 1976
- Cantabria - 1977
- Canary Islands - 1979

=== United Kingdom ===
- Scotland - 1969
- Northern Ireland - 1970
- Wales - 1970
- Guernsey - 1976
- Jersey - 1976

=== United States ===
- New Jersey - 1953
- New York - 1953
- California - 1954
- Florida - 1954
- Georgia - 1954
- Kansas - 1954
- Kentucky - 1954
- Maryland - 1954
- Massachusetts - 1954
- Missouri - 1954
- Oklahoma - 1954
- Oregon - 1954
- Pennsylvania - 1954
- Texas - 1954
- Virginia - 1954
- Wisconsin - 1954
- Arkansas - 1955
- Nebraska - 1955
- Illinois - 1956
- Arizona - 1956
- Hawaii - 1957
- Ohio - 1957
- Vermont - 1957
- Washington - 1958
- Tennessee - 1958
- Indiana - 1959
- Michigan - 1960
- Nevada - 1960
- New Hampshire - 1961
- Alabama - 1962
- Idaho - 1962
- Maine - 1962
- Utah - 1962
- West Virginia - 1962
- Iowa - 1963
- Louisiana - 1963
- North Carolina - 1963
- North Dakota - 1963
- Rhode Island - 1963
- Wyoming - 1963
- Colorado - 1964
- Connecticut - 1964
- Delaware - 1964
- Minnesota - 1964
- Mississippi - 1964
- Montana - 1964
- Alaska - 1966
- New Mexico - 1966
- South Carolina - 1966
- South Dakota - 1968

== List of regional subdivisions that never had black and white television ==
Regional subdivisions that never had black and white television (i.e., their first broadcasts were in color) are not included in the table above.

- Angola - Cabinda
- Australia - Riverland
- Spain - Ceuta
- Spain - Melilla
- Belgium - German-speaking Community

== See also ==
- Digital television transition
- Geographical usage of television
- Timeline of the introduction of television in countries
