= Television in Suriname =

Television was introduced to Suriname in 1965. STVS held a television monopoly until 1983, when ATV signed on. Suriname employs the American ATSC standard for digital television.

== History ==
The first television tests were conducted by the Kerstern firm in Paramaribo in 1958. In 1961, Frits Pengel of the Dutch omroep VARA (the current BNNVARA) wrote a plan to start television broadcasts in Suriname, justifying that television was not limited to industrialized countries. However, political problems, as well as a bad relation with the prime minister of the time, led to the shelving of the project. In 1963, when a new prime minister took over, he asked Frits Pengel to write a new report; subsequently STVS was founded in February 1964. During this period, a studio was built and the station and studio opened on 1 October 1965 with trial broadcasts, followed by full broadcasts on 20 October. STVS was delivered on VHF channel 8; Pengel would remain director of STVS until 1994.

With the growth of television in Suriname, color television began in 1977 on STVS and private television stations were legalized. ATV (up until the late 90s a state channel, channel 12) started broadcasting in 1983. In the mid-late 90s, new private networks such as Apintie (channel 10) and Ampie's Broadcasting Corporation (channel 4) opened, both were already the most important radio stations. There were also two subscription television channels, delivering movies, TV series and European soccer. Another source reported that, in 1997, cable offered sixteen channels. That year, RTL Nederland was interested in penetrating the Surinamese market, by creating a satellite channel combining content from its channels in the Netherlands.

As of 2010, competition was heavy in the Surinamese audiovisual landscape. For half a million people, there were at least thirty stations. Each station ran on a tight budget and all programs were sponsored. Among the newer channels included SBS (channel 32) and ethnic and religious channels, such as RBN (Rapar Broadcasting Network, channel 5) for the Surinamese Indian demographic and New Life Gospel Televisie (channel 52, an evangelical channel owned by New Life Dominion Gemeente). Surinamese TV at the time relied on the NOS-produced weather report for the Americas and the Caribbean produced by BVN, as producing a weather forecast in Suriname was deemed as being too expensive. Local programs at the time included 10 Minuten, a youth newscast seen on at least three channels, and the sitcom Bigi Famiri. Most stations produced little and aired a lot of foreign content; RBN also had a large library of Bollywood movies, which also includes new releases. RBN's staff worked with Indian agents for obtaining film rights.

The state company Telesur (also owner of ATV and TV2) began improving its digital infrastructure in the country's hinterland in April 2026, and developed the Telesur+ app. The app consists of streaming of key Surinamese channels (STVS, ATV, Apintie, SUN, Trishul, GOV TV, DNA TV, etc.) and sports channels such as ESPN and Rush Sports.

== See also ==
- List of television stations in Suriname
