= List of Premier League overseas broadcasters =

The Premier League (EPL) is the most-watched sports league in the world, with TV audiences of approximately 3.2 billion people across 188 countries. Since its creation in 1992, the Premier League has sold its international broadcasting rights centrally, and this global dominance is also reflected economically. The EPL is the only football league to generate over €1 billion per season from overseas TV rights, bringing in €1.58bn, followed by LaLiga (€897m), Serie A (€371m), Bundesliga (€240m), and Ligue 1 (€80m). The first contract for international rights was worth £8 million per year for five seasons. Income from international rights has experienced exponential growth in recent decades.

In the current 2022–2025 cycle, the Premier League's international TV rights have surpassed domestic deals for the first time, generating £5.3bn compared to £5.1bn for domestic rights. Several large deals include £2 billion from NBC in the US and another £2 billion from NENT in Nordic countries. It has also made significant sales in regions like China, sub-Saharan Africa, MENA, and France. In Europe, the EPL began offering 380 games per season starting in 2022, and four different live packages have been made available to interested parties:

- Live Package A: live rights to all 380 matches.
- Live Package B: a maximum of 34 matches per season, namely one Friday evening or Saturday.
- Live Package C: a maximum of 34 live matches per season. These would take place on Sunday or Monday, while a single final weekend fixture is again included.
- Live Package D: live rights to the remaining matches, between 312 and 314 matches per season.

Additionally, the Premier League has moved away from using intermediaries to sell its TV rights, opting instead to manage direct relationships with broadcasters. Bidders have the option to submit offers for either three- or six-year contracts. This shift aims to secure a more reliable revenue stream and provide certainty for all stakeholders involved.

== Premier League Productions ==
To serve the entire audience that follows the competition around the world, the Premier League runs a dedicated 's production arm, operated by IMG called Premier League Productions (PLP), that produces and distributes all of the Premier League’s international content, including the broadcasting of all 380 Premier League matches. In addition, it creates and delivers a range of digital content and support programming, as well as the Premier League Content Service, which is broadcast by some of the League’s partners as a full 24/7 channel.

The service offers international broadcast partners a combination of studio-based output, including pre- and post-match content, fan-focused agenda shows, magazine programming, classic matches from the Premier League’s extensive archive, and long-form storytelling as part of the new PL Originals strand.

They are also responsible for producing Goal Rush programme, the Premier League whiparound show that shows all of the goals and major incidents when there are several Premier League games being played at the same time on Saturday afternoon.

From 2026/27 season, the Premier League will bring all international media content production and distribution in-house through Premier League Studios (PLS).

== 2025–2028 ==
=== African broadcasters ===
| Country | Broadcasters |
|---|---|
| Sub-Saharan Africa | SuperSport |
| Sub-Saharan Africa | Canal+ Afrique |
| Benin | SRTB (Note: One match per round) |
| Botswana | YTV |
| Eswatini | Eswatini TV |
| Ghana | SportyTV |
| Kenya | SportyTV |
| Nigeria | SportyTV |
| Ivory Coast | NCI |
| Mozambique | TV Miramar |
| Namibia | One Africa TV |
| Senegal | RTS |
| South Africa | SABC Sport |
| Tanzania | UTV |
| Uganda | NBS Sport |
| Zambia | ZNBC |

=== Asian broadcasters ===
| Country | Broadcasters |
|---|---|
| Afghanistan | Meraj Sports |
| Bangladesh | Myco |
| Bangladesh | Bongo |
| Bangladesh | Toffee |
| Bangladesh | Rajdhani TV |
| Cambodia | JAS/MONOMAX |
| Central Asia | Setanta Sports |
| China | Migu |
| China | CCTV |
| Hong Kong | now TV |
| Indian subcontinent | Star Sports |
| Indonesia | Emtek |
| Iran | IRIB Varzesh |
| Iran | Gem Sport |
| Iran | Persiana Sports |
| Japan | U-Next |
| Laos | JAS/MONOMAX |
| Macau | M Plus |
| Malaysia | Astro Sports |
| Maldives | ICE Network |
| Mongolia | Premier Sports Network |
| Myanmar | Canal+ |
| Pakistan | Myco |
| Philippines | Setanta Sports |
| Singapore | StarHub |
| South Korea | Coupang Play |
| Taiwan | ELTA |
| Tajikistan | Varzish TV |
| Thailand | JAS/MONOMAX |
| Vietnam | FPT (from January 2026) (Note: FPT Play has entered into a strategic partnership with Jasmine International Public Company Limited (JAS), the official and exclusive rightsholders of the Premier League in Thailand, Laos, Cambodia, and Vietnam. The rights package runs from mid-season 2025/26 through the end of the 2030/31 season.) |
| Vietnam | K+ (until December 2025) (Note: Originally, K+ had their exclusive rights until 2028, however K+ in December 2025 officially announces they will cease broadcasting operations starting 1 January 2026.) |

=== European broadcasters ===
| Country | Broadcasters |
|---|---|
| Albania | SuperSport |
| Andorra | DAZN |
| Andorra | Movistar Plus+ |
| Armenia | Fast Sports |
| Austria | Sky Sport |
| Azerbaijan | Setanta Sports |
| Azerbaijan | Idman TV |
| Azerbaijan | SportTV |
| Belarus | TBD |
| Belgium | Play Sports |
| Bosnia and Herzegovina | Arena Sport |
| Croatia | Arena Sport |
| Cyprus | Cytavision Sports |
| Czech Republic | Canal+ Sport |
| Denmark | Viaplay |
| Denmark | Prime Video |
| Estonia | Go3 Sport |
| Finland | Viaplay |
| France | Canal+ |
| Georgia | Setanta Sports |
| Germany | Sky Sport |
| Greece | Nova Sports |
| Hungary | Spíler TV |
| Hungary | Arena4 |
| Iceland | Sýn Sport |
| Ireland | Premier Sports |
| Ireland | Sky Sports |
| Ireland | TNT Sports |
| Italy | Sky Sport |
| Kosovo | SuperSport |
| Latvia | Go3 Sport |
| Liechtenstein | Sky Sport |
| Lithuania | Go3 Sport |
| Luxembourg | Sky Sport |
| Luxembourg | Play Sports |
| Malta | Total Sports Network |
| Moldova | Setanta Sports |
| Montenegro | Arena Sport |
| Netherlands | Viaplay |
| Netherlands | Prime Video |
| North Macedonia | Arena Sport |
| Norway | Viaplay |
| Poland | Canal+ |
| Portugal | DAZN |
| Portugal | LiveModeTV |
| Romania | Voyo |
| San Marino | Sky Sport |
| Serbia | Arena Sport |
| Slovakia | Canal+ Sport |
| Slovenia | Arena Sport |
| Spain | DAZN |
| Spain | Movistar Plus+ |
| Sweden | Viaplay |
| Sweden | Prime Video |
| Switzerland | Sky Sport |
| Switzerland | Canal+ |
| Turkey | beIN Sports |
| Ukraine | Setanta Sports |

=== Latin American broadcasters ===
| Country | Broadcasters |
|---|---|
| Brazil | ESPN |
| Brazil | CazéTV |
| South America | ESPN |
| Central America and Mexico | Warner Bros. Discovery |
| Central America and Mexico | Fox |
| Costa Rica | Teletica |
| El Salvador | TCS |
| Honduras | TVC |

=== Middle Eastern and North African broadcasters ===
| Country | Broadcasters |
|---|---|
| Israel | Sport 1 |
| MENA | beIN Sports |

=== North American and Caribbean broadcasters ===
| Country | Broadcasters |
|---|---|
| Canada | fuboTV |
| Caribbean | ESPN |
| Haiti | Canal+ |
| Dominican Republic | Warner Bros. Discovery |
| Puerto Rico; United States | NBC/Telemundo |
| Puerto Rico; United States | USA Network |
| Suriname | ABC |
| Suriname | ATV |
| Suriname | SCCN |
| Suriname | STVS |
| Suriname | QN Sport |

=== Oceania broadcasters ===
| Country | Broadcasters |
|---|---|
| Australia | Stan Sport (Note: Optus Sport has transferred its broadcast rights to the Premier League over to Nine's Stan streaming service. In the first three weeks, one match also air on Nine network.) |
| New Zealand | Sky Sport |
| Pacific Islands | Digicel |
| Papua New Guinea | Digicel |

== 2028–2031 ==
=== Asian broadcasters ===
| Country | Broadcasters |
|---|---|
| Japan | U-Next |
| Vietnam | FPT |

=== Oceania broadcasters ===
| Country | Broadcasters |
|---|---|
| Australia | Stan Sport (Note: Through to the 2033/34 season) |
