= List of 2024 Summer Olympics broadcasters =

The 2024 Summer Olympics in Paris were televised by a number of broadcasters throughout the world. As with previous years, Olympic Broadcasting Services (OBS) produced the world feed provided to local broadcasters for use in their coverage. In most regions, broadcast rights to the 2022 and 2024 Olympics were packaged together, but some broadcasters obtained rights to further games as well.

== Broadcasters ==
In France, domestic rights to the 2024 Summer Olympics were owned by Warner Bros. Discovery (formerly Discovery Inc.) via Eurosport, with free-to-air coverage sub-licensed to the country's public broadcaster France Télévisions.

The official Olympics website offered both live-streaming and recent recordings of the events in selected markets, particularly in Brazil, Russia (due to Russian broadcasters pulling out), and the Indian subcontinent.

=== Russian broadcasting rights issue ===
Although the IOC listed Telesport Russia as the nominal rights holder for Russia, the main Russian and Belarusian broadcasters were not officially showing the Games in protest of the sanctions imposed on the two countries, which led to a reduced quota of 32 athletes that were listed as neutrals: Belarus and Russia last refused to purchase the broadcasting rights in 1984. The Associated Press noted on 27 July 2024 that Belarusian and Russian viewers were depending on satellite channels and streaming services of neighbouring countries (such as Kazakhstan) to get reasonable coverage of the Games.

=== Issues on the Taiwanese broadcasts ===
Chunghwa Telecom, which gained exclusive IPTV and streaming rights from Olympics domestic rights holder ELTA TV, reported that their streaming platform Hami Video experienced server crashes for the last 2 games during the men's double badminton knockout stage. Once when the Chinese Taipei male duos (Lee Yang and Wang Chi-lin) successfully advanced to the gold medal matches, and then again when they successfully won the gold medals as the viewership for the game grew rapidly.

Additionally, many cable TV providers and even Taiwanese politicians were criticized about how ELTA TV shared the broadcasting rights other than CHT MOD and Hami Video/ELTA OTT, in which jeopardized the cable TV broadcast availability and even limited the games' coverage for free-to-air TV networks (such as the government-owned TBS network).

=== List of broadcast rights holders by territory ===
Territory	Rights holder	Ref
Afghanistan	ATN	
Albania	RTSH	
Algeria	EPTV	
Andorra	RTVA	
Argentina	TVP; TyC Sports	
Armenia	ARMTV	
Asia	Dentsu (Note: Rights to be sold to local broadcasters)	
Australia	Nine	
Austria	ORF	
Azerbaijan	İTV	
Barbados	CBC	
Belgium	RTBF; VRT	
Bolivia	Bolivisión	
Bosnia and Herzegovina	BHRT	
Brazil	Rede Globo; CazéTV; Olympics.com	
Brunei	RTB	
Bulgaria	BNT	
Burkina Faso	RTB	
Cambodia	CBS	
Cameroon	CRTV	
Canada	CBC/Radio-Canada; TSN; RDS; Sportsnet	
Cape Verde	RTC	
Caribbean	SportsMax	
Chile	Chilevisión	
China	CMG; Migu; Douyin (Note: On-demand and replay only); Kuaishou; Tencent	
Hong Kong, China	RTHK; HOY TV; HKTVE; TVB	
Macau, China	TDM	
Costa Rica	Repretel	
Croatia	HRT	
Colombia	Caracol Televisión; RCN Televisión	
Cuba	ICRT	
Cyprus	CyBC	
Czech Republic	ČT	
Denmark	DR; TV 2	
Dominican Republic	Antena 7	
Ecuador	RTS; TVC	
El Salvador	Canal 12	
Estonia	Postimees Group	
Ethiopia	EBC	
Europe	Eurosport (Note: Free-to-air rights to be sold to local broadcasters, except Russia)	
Fiji	Fiji TV	
Finland	Yle	
France	France Télévisions	
Georgia	GPB	
Germany	ARD; ZDF	
Ghana	Sporty TV	
Greece	ERT	
Guatemala	Chapín TV	
Guinea	RTG	
Honduras	VTV	
Hungary	MTVA	
Iceland	RÚV	
India	Doordarshan	
Indian subcontinent	Viacom18; Olympics.com	
Indonesia	Emtek (SCTV, Moji, Vidio, NEX, Champions TV)	
Iran	IRIB Varzesh	
Ireland	RTÉ	
Israel	Sports Channel	
Italy	RAI	
Ivory Coast	RTI	
Jamaica	TVJ	
Japan	Japan Consortium	
Kazakhstan	Qazaqstan; Khabar	
Kenya	KBC	
Kosovo	RTK	
Kyrgyzstan	KTRK	
Latin America (Note: Except Brazil and Cuba)	América Móvil	
Latvia	LTV	
Liberia	LBS	
Lithuania	TV3	
Luxembourg	RTL	
Malaysia	Astro; Unifi TV; RTM	
Maldives	ICE Network	
MENA	beIN Sports	
Mexico	TelevisaUnivision	
Moldova	TVR	
Mongolia	Premier Sports Network; Central TV	
Montenegro	RTCG	
Morocco	SNRT	
Mozambique	TVM	
Myanmar	Forever Group	
Netherlands	NOS	
New Zealand	Sky Television	
Nicaragua	Canal 10	
Nigeria	Sporty TV	
North Korea	KCTV	
North Macedonia	MRT	
Norway	NRK (Note: Athletic events and Opening/Closing ceremonies only)	
Pacific Islands (Note: Included nations & territories are Cook Islands, Fiji, Kiribati, Marshall Islands, Federated States of Micronesia, Nauru, Niue, Palau, Samoa, Solomon Islands, Tonga, Tuvalu and Vanuatu.)	Sky Pacific	
Pakistan	ARY	
Panama	TVMax	
Paraguay	SNT	
Papua New Guinea	EM TV	
Peru	Grupo ATV	
Philippines	Cignal TV; PLDT; Smart	
Poland	TVP	
Portugal	RTP	
Qatar	Alkass Sports	
Romania	TVR	
Russia	Olympics.com	
Saint Lucia	HTS	
Samoa	SBC	
Senegal	RTS	
Serbia	RTS	
Seychelles	SBC	
Singapore	Mediacorp	
Slovakia	STVR	
Slovenia	RTV	
Solomon Islands	Solomon Telekom	
South Africa	SABC; SuperSport	
South Korea	KBS; MBC; SBS	
Spain	RTVE	
Sri Lanka	ThePapare TV	
Sub-Saharan Africa	Infront Sports & Media; SuperSport; TV5Monde Afrique	
Suriname	ATV; STVS; SCCN	
Sweden	Kanal 5	
Switzerland	SRG SSR	
Taiwan	ELTA TV; Chunghwa Telecom; TBS (Note: Over the air and cable broadcast (including Chunghwa Telecom MOD) only)	
Tajikistan	Varzish TV	
Tanzania	ZBC2	
Thailand	AIS; TrueVisions; T Sports 7; MCOT; 7HD; PPTV	
Timor-Leste	Olympics.com	
Togo	TVT	
Trinidad and Tobago	TTT	
Turkey	TRT	
Turkmenistan	Olympics.com	
Uganda	NBS Sport	
Ukraine	Suspilne	
United Kingdom	BBC	
United States	NBCUniversal	
Uruguay	Canal 5; Canal 4	
Uzbekistan	MTRK	
Venezuela	TVES	
Vietnam	VTV (Note: Delayed coverage and closing ceremony only)	
Zambia	ZNBC	
