= BK (music producer) =

- Born: Johnny Óscar López Pimentel; August 10, 1990 (age 35); Panama City, Panama
- Genres: Reggae en Español, reggaeton
- Occupation: music producer
- Years active: 2007–present
- Website: bkmusica.com

BK (born Johnny Óscar López Pimentel, Panama City, August 10, 1990) is a Panamanian music producer, composer, and artist. He has collaborated with artists such as Daddy Yankee, Natti Natasha, Sech, Arcángel, and Justin Quiles. In 2024 BK won the Latin Grammy in the best urban song category ‘Bonita’ together with the American Sergio George created for Daddy Yankee.

== Musical career ==
In 2007, López began creating instrumentals for urban music artists in his country.

In 2010, he achieved his first hit in Panama with the song "Ella Baila Sola" featuring Jhonny D, followed by "Quitátelo To'" with Bossy Lion, both released under his own record label, Genios Musicales. By 2011, BK had already recorded with key figures in the Panamanian urban music scene such as Kafu Banton, Tommy Real, and Latin Fresh.

In 2021, BK was nominated for a Premios Juventud award in the Producer of the Year category. He also produced Ozuna's single "24/7" in collaboration with Dimelo Flow and Zetta Music.

In 2024, he won a Latin Grammy for his work on Daddy Yankee song "Bonita," solidifying his position as one of the most influential Panamanian producers in contemporary Latin music.

== Personal life ==
BK lives in Panama and maintains his Christian faith. In 2016, he won the first season of the Panamanian program "Esto es guerra" broadcast by TVN.
