= Radika (Suriname) =

- Paramaribo; Suriname
- Broadcast area: Paramaribo
- Frequency: 98,3 MHz (Paramaribo)

Programming
- Languages: Dutch, Sarnami Hindustani
- Format: Full service

Ownership
- Owner: Its shareholders

History
- First air date: September 9, 1962 (radio); 1990 (television)

Radika, full name Radio Dihaat Ki Awaaz, (literally "Voice of the District), is a Surinamese media company. It was founded as a radio station in 1962. The military set the station on fire in 1982, thus suspending operations until 1990. Since then it provided both radio and television (Radika TV). In July 2018, Radika was rented to influential politicians for two years. At the end of the contract, it was discovered that Radika's assets disappeared, causing it to cease transmission on July 1, 2020.

== Target ==
The broadcasts are in both Dutch and Sarnami Hindustani and cater to the Hindustani community. The station is aligned to the Progressive Reform Party, which has a large Hindustani base.

== History ==
Radio Radika opened on 9 September 1962 under Shew Shawh Radhakishun, an engineer working at mining company Billiton, and his brother and rich businessman Harry Sharuh Radhakishun. After Shew died in 1971 at the age of 47, his nephew Edith Radhakishun and Shews's wife Roshnie Ramlakhan took over. In 1973, Shew's oldest son, nMahindra Radhakishun, took over the administrative post.

=== 1980 fire ===
After the coup d'état, Radika criticized the new governors. Announcer Bram Behr had a negative view of Desi Bouterse's military dictatorship, while announcer Prem Radhakishun took part in a student anti-dictatorship protest. Opposition to the military caused Radika to pay a huge prive. On 7 December 1982, while the December murders in Fort Zeelandia perpetuated by the military governors began, the station was damaged by grenades, burning it completely, including other private outlets such as ABC, Moederbond and De Vrije Stem, which were housed on the same building.

In October 2017, one of the soldiers of the Group of 16, Ruben Rozendaal, admitted that he and Roy Esajas received orders to get to the building to prevent the fires from stopping. A recording of Bouterse's instructions was played on the NOS radio program Zorg en Hoop one month after the events. Upon advice from family members in the Netherlands, Roshnie Radhakishun and his children followed him.

=== Relaunch ===
Overnight, Radhakishun remained in misery and dependent on help from others. However, when she and her son Mahindra returned to Suriname in 1987:

"Even if I return "ondro oso" (under the house), the radio station will soon be heard again."

In 1990, the station restarted radio broadcasts, with help of an old collection of Indian records Rashid Pierkhan (of Rapar) owned, sold in parcels. With the 1990 relaunch came the launch of Radika's TV station.
