= Television in Panama =

Television was introduced to Panama extra-officially in 1956 with the start of SCN in the Panama Canal Zone and officially on March 14, 1960, with the launch of RPC Televisión. Currently Corporación MEDCOM and TVN Media dominate the landscape.

== History ==
=== Early years ===
With the support of American engineers, RPC Televisión started broadcasting on March 14, 1960, owned by Radio Programas Continentales. Its inaugural acts had the participation of President Ernesto de la Guardia, as well as other political personalities of the time. It broadcast from 4:30pm to 11pm, with an abundant quantity of live programs and two news bulletins. There was also coverage of the 1960 presidential elections, held in May of that year.

A supposed appearance of candidate Chiari led to the appearance of a second television channel. Upon winning the 1960 elections, the plan to launch their station gained impulse. Since September 1959, Harmodio Arias Madrid has gained the license to operate on channel 2, but the station never made it to air. Some suggest that Arias lost the rights to the station but others say that Arias couldn't launch his license on time. Roberto Chiari took the occasion to set up a station on channel 2, Televisora Nacional, on April 23, 1962, whose first commercial name was Tevedos. The station had technical support from ABC International Television Inc. with a heavy emphasis on musical shows and American imports. It broadcast from 2pm to midnight, having a half-hour news bulletin at 10pm.

With two television stations (TVN-2 and RPC-4) joining the extant AFRTS station SCN-8, the Panamanian television market began to stabilize. On November 1, 1964, a regional television station in Chiriquí Province, Tele-Barú, started broadcasting. However, the station shut down on January 4, 1967, due to lack of viability.

Competition between RPC and TVN was made in several ways: who had the better imports, expansion of the coverage area and updated recording and transmission technologies. TVN had expanded to the provinces of Coclé, Herrera, Los Santos and Venegas in 1965 and in 1968, Chiriquí. RPC had covered all of Panama by the end of the decade.

=== The coup and color TV ===
Following the 1968 Panamanian coup d'état, new technologies were being implemented. In the early 1970s, live sporting events became a possibility thanks to satellite technologies, while TVN became the first in Panama to broadcast in color in 1972. That same year, the two Panamanian networks broadcast a sum of 180 hours and 45 minutes per week, with 71.6% consisting of imports and the remaining 28.4% produced in Panama. A closed circuit educational television station started operations in November 1973 in the University of Panama before becoming a channel in its own right, Televisión Educativa Experimental, the current SERTV, on January 22, 1978, on channel 6, later moving to channel 11.

=== New legislation ===
Changes to the legislation were enacted in 1980, breaking the commercial monopoly of the Eleta and Chiari families. The passing of Law 36 in the Official Gazette in 1980 gave licenses to Panavisión del Istmo, of Vice-president Ricardo de la Espriella, on channel 5 in Panamá Province and Medios Panameños, of ex-chancellor Nicolás González Revilla, gained channel 13 in the metropolitan area of the capital, creating Telemetro. Telemetro started on October 13, 1981 as a subscription television channel with a six-hour schedule of three movies, mostly vintage. A relay station in Colón was installed in 1983, before achieving total national coverage in 1992. Panavisión, on its hand, started broadcasting on October 21, 1983. Within a year, Panavisión had already set up relay stations to cover all nine provinces.

Although Panavisión was an impartial network, the station was later taken by the military forces which ultimately led to De la Espriella losing its television license, upon losing support from Noriega. The exit of Nicolás Ardito Barletta from its management caused Arturo del Valle to buy the station. Eventually Del Valle left the control of the station causing Panavisión to file for bankruptcy and shut down before the end of the dictatorship.

The Chiari family sold TVN to colonels and people with connections to the National Guard, however it has been theorized that the station was expropriated by orders of Noriega and the Defense Forces. The Chiaris moved to the agricultural industry, while one of their descendants, Rodolfo Chiari de León, continued working at the station as general manager.

In 1989, RPC and Telemetro were sanctioned by Minister of Government and Justice, Rodolfo Chiari de León, for its lack of support of its services for the State. TVN was faithful to the military regime and wasn't penalized. Tensions between the networks and the regime skyrocketed, to an extent where, ahead of the American invasion, all Panamanian media outlets closed. SCN TV continued operations.

=== The 90s ===
On December 25, 1989 (Christmas Day), RPC is authorized to return to the air, but its programming was limited to a special Christmas mass. In the days that followed, the only program that was broadcast was Los del Camino, a daily reflection produced by the Catholic Church. In April, TVN, Telecinco and Telemetro returned to the air, but with the same limitations imposed to RPC.

TVN returns to its legitimate owners in 1990, but the government ordered the sale of its assets in order to become a private company. A group of young businessmen took over control of the state assets. The company, Peninsula Holding, bought TVN in order to cleanse its negative image rooted with the military dictatorship, in order to regain its top spot in ratings, as well as increasing the amount of local programming, which by 1995 amounted to 40 weekly hours, emphasizing on sports and news. The Motta family, one of the richest in Panama, later bought the channel from Peninsula.

Panavisión del Istmo, owner of Panavisión (later Telecinco), was later given to the Catholic Church-backed Fundación para la Educación en la Televisión (FETV), which had planned the creation of an educational channel for years, but was plagued by lack of resources. The strong support of the Catholic Church in the redemocratization of Panama in the first few months of 1990 gave a strong impetus to its creation. Its broadcasts started on April 1, 1992, broadcasting four hours a day from Monday to Friday and a further four hours on Sunday mornings. As a non-profit organization it received fiscal benefits from Asociación para la Promoción de la Cultura en los Medios de Comunicación (APROCULMEC), who used money from Cable Onda subscriptions to sustain its operations until it was sold to MEDCOM in 1997. After that, FETV relied on donations.

In 1995, talks to merge the media interests of the Eleta and González Revilla families emerged, with the merger coming to fruition on July 15, 1997, creating Corporación MEDCOM. Both families own MEDCOM through Multiholding Corp., owners of two television channels (RPC and Telemetro), two radio stations (RPC Radio and Caliente) and two cable companies (Telesat and Cable Onda). The merger was to cut operation costs, increase investment flow in the television and telecommunications industries and compete with the launch of DirecTV in the country (now under Sky México). DirecTV was represented by Ricardo Martinelli, who sided with TVN. RPC and Telemetro continued having their own identities, granted that their primetime schedules had to change in order not to collide with each other. When RPC was airing telenovelas, Telemetro was airing the news.

In 1999, in anticipation for the return of the control of the Panama Canal to the Panamanian government, SCN shut down its radio and TV operations. Its equipment was dispatched to the United States and Puerto Rico while local broadcasts ceased on July 1, 1999. SCN definitively went off the air on December 31.

=== New channels ===
The shutdown of SCN left the frequency vacant and the creation of a bidding process for channel 8. Local companies were interested in taking it over, but in March, the government suspended the process.

Radio Cadena Millennium (RCM), owned by Julio Miller, begins its plan to bid for a license on the UHF band in 1998. Its broadcasts started on August 6, 2000, on channel 21, with an all-news format. In 2004, it bid for two further licenses, creating RCM Fem for women and RCM Plus for the youth. The evangelical denomination Hosanna launched Hosanna Visión on January 31, 2003 on channel 37. In August of that year it had reached all provinces except Darién. In December 2003, Más 23 started broadcasting as a youth channel targeting the niche demographic that was catered by MTV. On April 3, 2005, TVN launched TVMax on channel 9 absorbing TVN's sports coverage, movies, international series, as well as game shows and reality shows. This division enabled TVN to concentrate on the main segment and TVMax, on the alternative segment. MEDCOM on its behalf announced in March that it would launch Tele 7 on May 7 the same year. Aimed primarily at children and teenagers, MEDCOM's goal was to maximize its audience and offer a more complete scheme while reaching a segment of the population with purchasing influence. Cable Onda, owned by MEDCOM, launched local cable channels: Eco TV (news), Cable Onda Sports, Travel Panamá and Mall TV. The limited results of Tele 7, coupled by its limited coverage area (the channel never reached the central provinces, Colón and Darién) led to Mall TV starting its terrestrial signal in its frequencies.

In 2007, Aris de Icaza, politician and owner of the Exitosa radio network, launched a television license, on channel 27.
