= Henry of France =

Henry of France may refer to:

- Henry I of France (1008–1060), King of France, reigned 1027–1060
- Henry II of France (1519–1559), King of France, reigned 1547–1559
- Henry III of France (1551–1589), King of France, reigned 1573–1575
- Henry IV of France (1553–1610), King of France, reigned 1589–1610
- Henry V of France (1820–1883), pretender, 19th century
- Henry of France (born 1083 and died young), second son of Philip I of France
- Henry of France, Archbishop of Reims (1121–1175), Bishop of Beauvais then Archbishop of Reims, son of Louis VI of France

== See also ==
- Henri de France, French television inventor
