= René Barthélemy =

French engineer

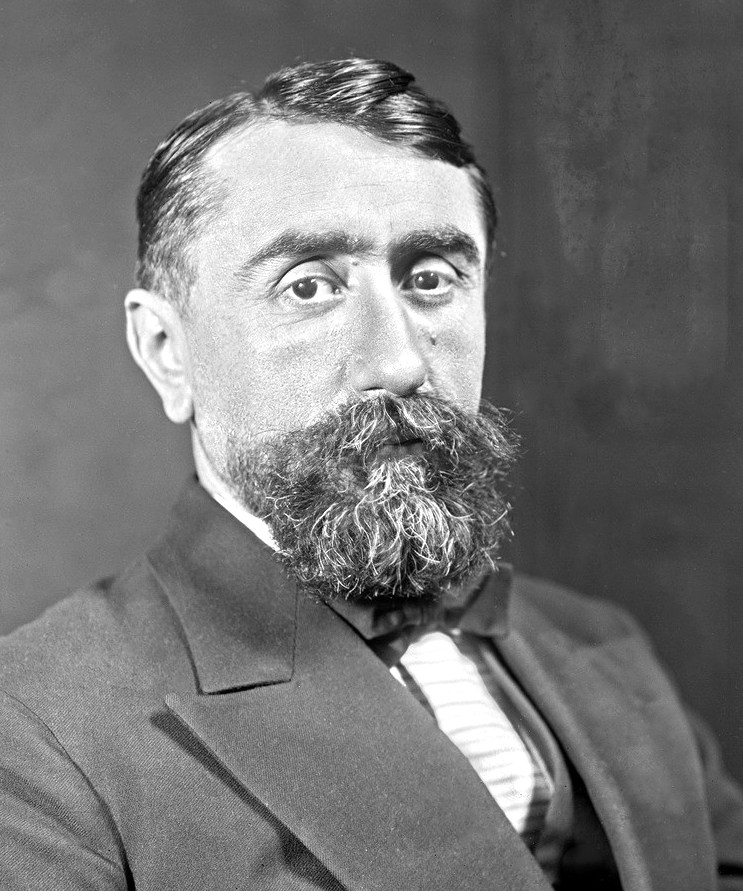
- René Barthélemy in 1931
- Born: 10 March 1889; Nangis, France
- Died: 12 February 1954 (aged 64); Antibes, France
- Occupation: Engineer
- Known for: Development of television

René Barthélemy (10 March 1889 – 12 February 1954) was a French engineer and a pioneer in the development of television technologies.

== Background ==
The invention of television was a slow enterprise of collective improvement between researchers and do-it-yourselfers from different countries, the first concepts of which date back to the end of the 1870s. It was the successive discoveries in electricity and optics that made it possible to formulate the theoretical projects, the first experiments and the first demonstrations.

== Biography ==
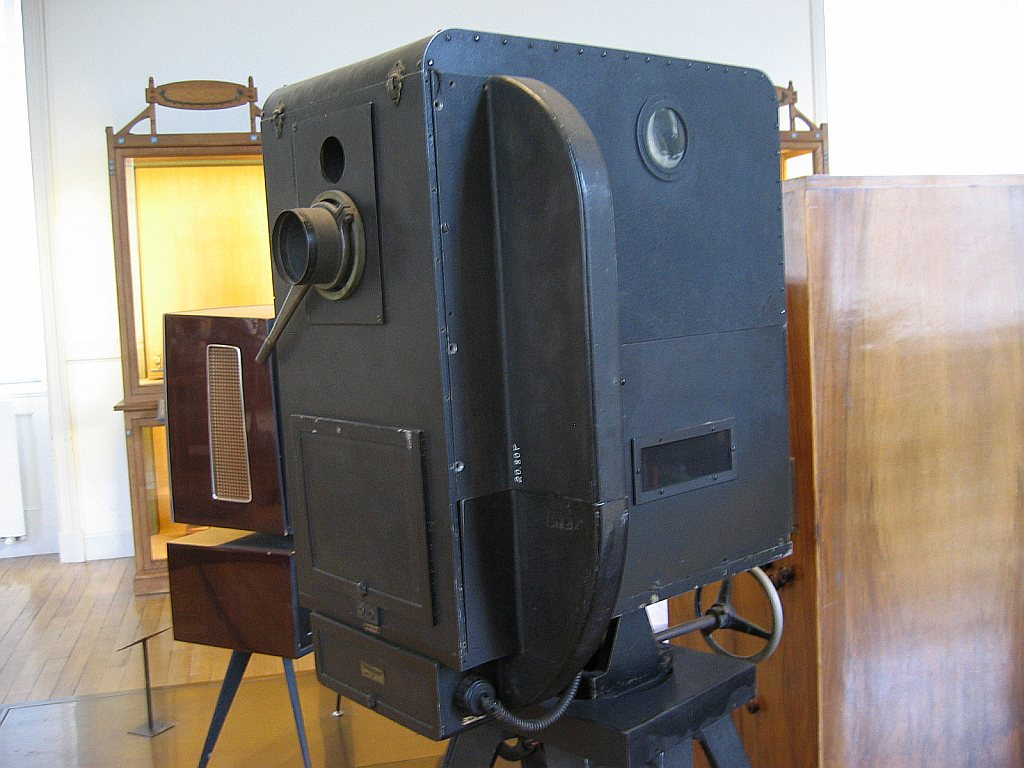
Barthélemy camera from 1935 kept at the CNAM.

Barthélemy was the son of a tailor from Nangis, and his teachers encouraged him to continue his studies in engineering in which during 1909–1910 he studied for a diploma from the École Supérieure d'Électricité. At 22 years old he was a radio-telegraphist at the Eiffel Tower. In 1922 he filed a patent on mains power supply for radio receivers for which, until then, heavy and bulky batteries were used; his invention assisted the development of radio broadcasting in France. He achieved the radio transmission of still images from the Eiffel Tower in January 1930. Prints of images were received at a resolution of 42 lines on a 132 mm wide roll of cyanotype paper.

== Television ==
By 1929 Barthélemy had been made head of the new television research laboratory, created by Jean Le Duc at the request of Ernest Chamon, CEO of the Compagnie des Compteurs in Montrouge.

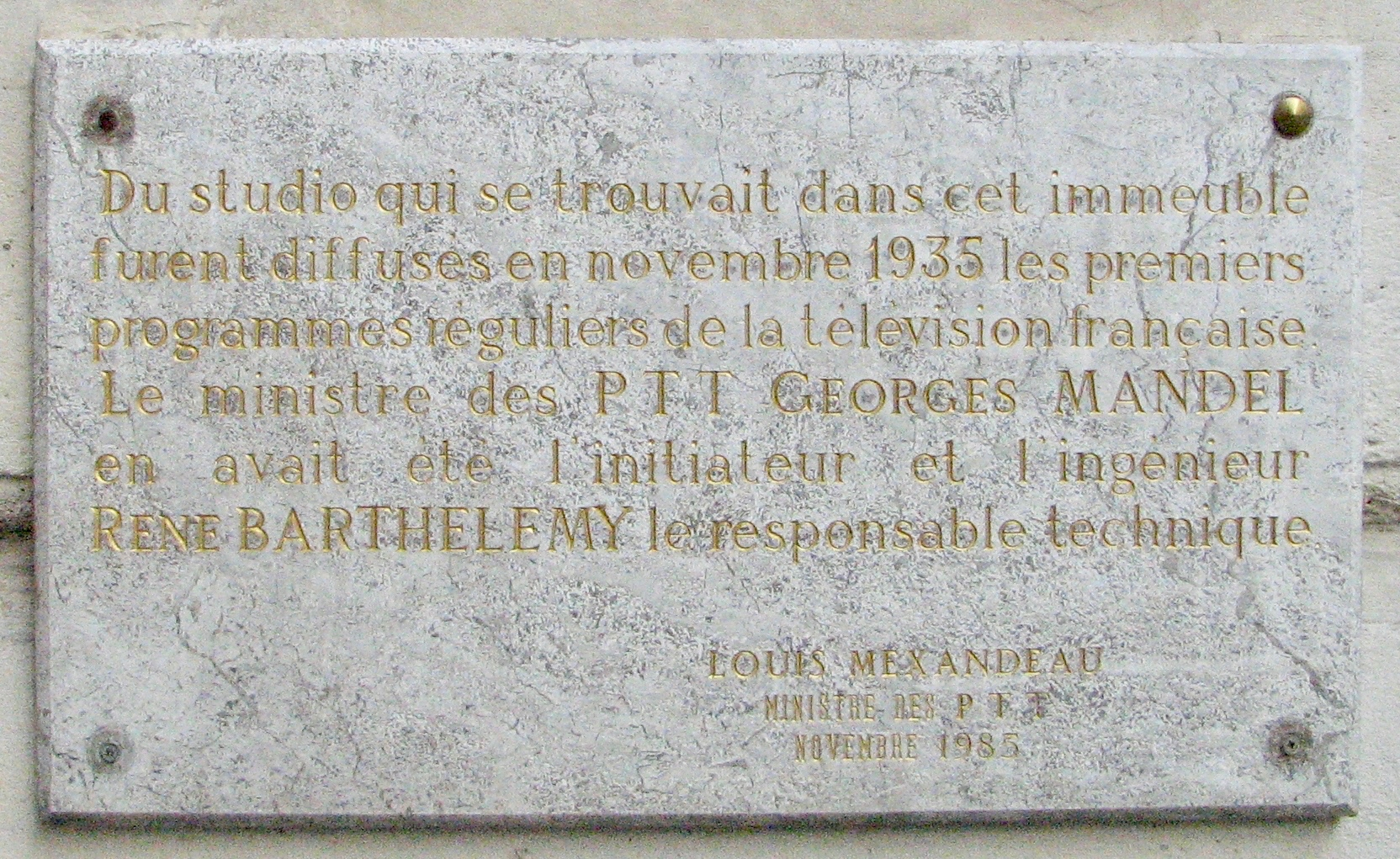
Plaque commemorating the first television broadcasts in France

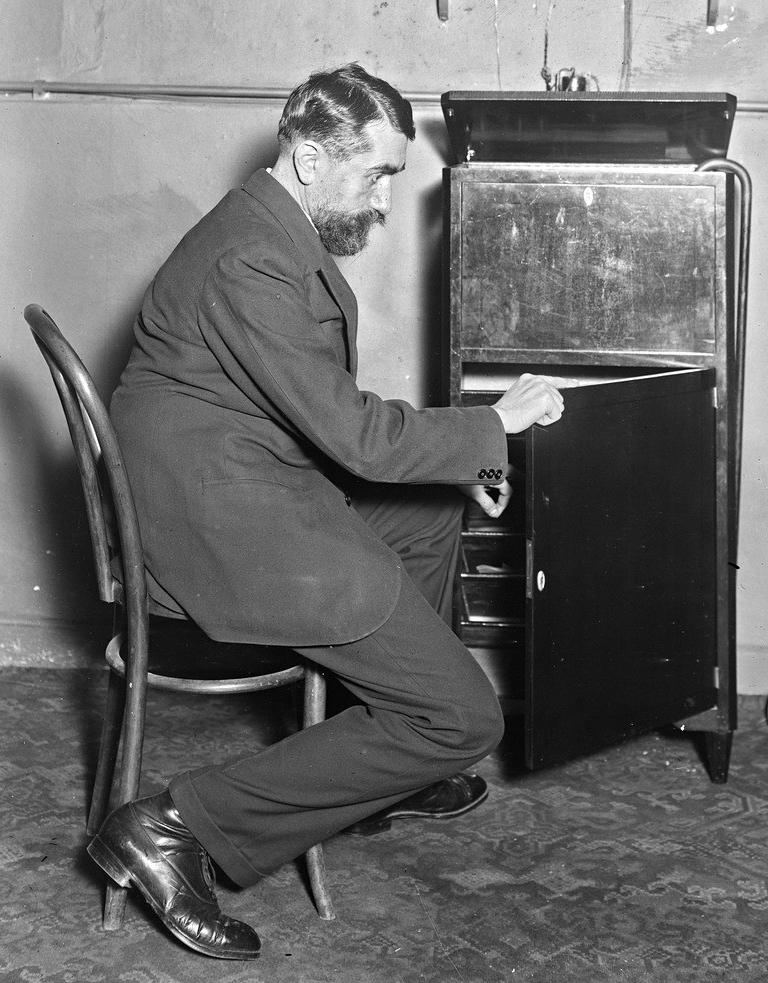
René Barthélémy with a 1931 television set

A demonstration of television had been carried out at the Olympia Cinema in November 1930 using John Logie Baird's system. The second public demonstration of television in France, on 14 April 1931, was in the amphitheater of the School of Electricity at Malakoff in front of 800 guests. The receiver used the lensed Nipkow disc with a screen of 40 cm x 30 cm and a mechanical mirror camera of Weiller design at a resolution of 30 lines, developed in the Compagnie des Compteurs laboratory. This "radiovision" experience is the first from a radio transmitter (located 2 kilometers away, in the buildings of the Compagnie des Compteurs), others having been carried out previously but by wire: viewers were shown the broadcast of the short film L'Espagnole à l'éventail presented by Suzanne Bridoux, a collaborator of René Barthélemy and the first presenter in the history of French television.

Continuing his work under the auspices of Postes, télégraphes et téléphones (PTT), Barthélemy developed from December 1932 a new design at 60 lines definition and produced an experimental program in black and white of one hour per week, "Paris Télévision". The first official French television broadcast took place on 26 April 1935, under the aegis of Georges Mandel, Minister of PTT, from the studio at 103 rue de Grenelle. It was a twenty-minute sequence in which the actress Béatrice Bretty read a text recounting her recent tour of Italy: Radio-PTT Vision, the first French television channel, was born.

From November 1935, the Eiffel Tower served as a transmitting antenna with a power of 10 kW. On 2 December 1935, continuing to perfect his devices, Barthélemy developed and produced an output of 180 lines of definition, but the time of "mechanical" disc television was over and advances in electronics were paving the way for modern television. At the beginning of 1937, programs were more frequent and took place every evening from 8:00 pm to 8:30 pm, broadcasting over a radius of 100 km.

Television took off, but the number of sets was still very low (in France; a hundred in 1935, 3,000 in 1949, half a million in 1956). René Barthélemy's “EMYVISOR” cathode-ray tube receiver was marketed by EMYRADIO, around December 1935.

René Barthélemy, by then a member of the Académie des sciences, despite poor health, continued to work effectively in the field of television, bringing to it his inventiveness, and undertook systematic research to detect the radiation discovered by the inventor Marcel Violet and to determine that its frequency is in a range beyond 10^{24} .

Despite his recommendation to develop a broadcasting network at 1045 lines, it was the 819 standard achieved by Henri de France which was adopted by the Minister of Information François Mitterrand. Disappointed, Barthélemy decided to retire.

Barthélémy died on 12 February 1954 at Antibes, and is buried in the Fontenay-aux-Roses cemetery.

== Publications ==
- Barthélemy, René (1946). Notice sur les travaux de R. Barthélemy: télévision, radioélectricité, appareils de mesure (in French). Fontenay-aux-Roses: Impr. de Bellenand. OCLC 458645373.
- Barthélemy, René; Académie des sciences (France) (1947). Commémoration du soixante-dixième anniversaire de l'invention du phonographe par Charles Cros : au Conservatoire national des arts et métiers, à Paris, le 19 décembre 1947 (in French). Paris: Palais de l'Institut. OCLC 491025916.
- Barthélemy, René (1947). Contribution à l'étude des analyseurs électroniques; l'iconoscope, l'isoscope (in French). Paris: L.E.P.S. OCLC 11168529.
- Barthélemy, René. Remise de l'épée à Monsieur René Barthélémy, membre de l'Académie des sciences : Au studio de la télévision, le 16 novembre 1946 (in French). Paris: Luys. OCLC 1032610407.
- Barthélemy, René; Académie des sciences (France) (1947). Commémoration du soixante-dixième anniversaire de l'invention du phonographe par Charles Cros, au Conservatoire national des arts et métiers, à Paris, le vendredi 19 décembre 1947 (in French). Paris: Palais de l'Institut. OCLC 458645368.
- Barthélemy, René (1947). Television (in French). Lille: s.n. OCLC 431404517.
- Barthélemy, René (1949). Notice sur la vie et l'oeuvre de Georges Charpy (1865–1945): déposée en la séance du 16 juin 1947 (in French). Paris: Gauthier-Villars. OCLC 494957300.

== Honors ==
- Member of the Académie des sciences, on 18 March 1946
- Commander of the Légion d'honneur, on 12 February 1954

== Bibliography ==
- Bibliography of writings by and about René Barthélemy relating to television (Site History of television)
- Caunes, Georges de (1997). René Barthélemy ou La grande aventure de la télévision française (in French). Saint-Martin-d'Hères (Isère): PUG. ISBN 978-2-7061-0725-2. OCLC 490396276.

== See also ==
- Television in France
