= 10 Minuten Jeugdjournaal =

Surinamese children's news program

10 Minuten Jeugdjournaal is a children's news program airing on several television stations in Suriname. Created under the initiative of Dutch NGO Freevoice, its primary target is the 10-14 year demographic. Both the name and its length come from the average attention span of its target audience at the time of its creation.

The program started broadcasting on 22 October 2004, with the aim of giving the youth a voice. In its first year, it attracted a 91% viewership rating in the intended demographic, being carried at 7 p.m. three times a week (Mondays, Wednesdays and Fridays), not only in Suriname (on STVS and ABC), but also, from early 2005, in Amsterdam on local station AT5, in order to cater to the Surinamese diaspora living there to receive news from their homeland. Freevoice received training from NOS Jeugdjournaal in the Netherlands and did similar projects abroad.

STVS, one of the channels carrying the program, received a warning due to an airing of a program on the 31st anniversary of the murder of fifteen Surinamese who criticized the ruling democracy in 1982.

On 22 October 2024, coinciding with its twentieth anniversary, Hennah Draaibaar left and was replaced by Iwan Brave. Since its beginning, 10 Minuten was a platform for future television presenters, who now have professional media careers.
