= CCIR System F =

819-line analog television transmission format

CCIR System F was an adaptation of System E used in Belgium (1953, RTB) and Luxembourg (1955, Télé Luxembourg). With only half the vision bandwidth and approximately half the sound carrier offset, it allowed French 819-line programming to squeeze into the 7 MHz VHF broadcast channels used in those neighboring countries, albeit with a substantial loss of horizontal resolution. Use of System F was discontinued in Belgium in February 1968, and in Luxembourg in September 1971.

Between 1976 and 1981 when French channel TF1 was switching area by area to the new analog 625-lines UHF network with SECAM colour, some transmitters and gapfillers broadcast the 819-line signal in UHF. When switching to 625-lines, most gapfillers did not change UHF channel (e.g. many gapfillers using this transmission located in French Alps near Grenoble, Mont Salève, and Geneva began broadcasting on UHF channel 42, and continue to use this frequency to this day). They were switched to 625-lines in June 1981.

== System F specifications ==
Some of the important specs are listed below:

- Frame rate: 25 Hz
- Interlace: 2/1
- Field rate: 50 Hz
- Lines/frame: 819
- Line rate: 20.475 kHz
- Visual bandwidth: 5 MHz
- Vision modulation: Positive
- Preemphasis: 50 μs
- Sound modulation: AM
- Sound offset: +5.5 MHz
- Channel bandwidth: 7 MHz

== See also ==
- CCIR System E
- Broadcast television systems
- Television transmitter
- Transposer
