= Southern Command Network =

American Forces Network in the Panama Canal Zone

The Southern Command Network (SCN) was a unit of the American Forces Network whose primary market was the Panama Canal Zone. Its operation was provided initially by Armed Forces Radio (AFN) at Albrook Field and later as the Caribbean Forces Network at Fort Clayton with translators on the Atlantic side of the Zone. In the early 1960s with reorganization of the command located in the Canal Zone, CFN became the Southern Command Network (SCN). SCN expanded to Honduras starting in 1987. SCN discontinued broadcasting on 1 July 1999, just before the 31 December turnover of the Canal Zone to the Republic of Panama when U.S. troops were removed from that country under the Torrijos-Carter Treaties.

== History ==
NBC started donating 2,000 pounds worth of programs to a station in Panama in September 1941 before the invasion of Pearl Harbor; its broadcasts became regular in early 1942. On May 6, 1956, SCN started television broadcasts on channel 8 in the Panama Canal Zone, nearly four years before the launch of RPC Televisión. It had a relay on channel 10 in the Atlantic zone. The network adopted the SCN name in 1963. Although the channel was originally restricted to servicemen in the Panama Canal Zone, the signal was clear in Panama City and Colón, where bilingual families started buying television sets.

SCN was the only operation under the direct control of the local unified command (SOUTHCOM). At the end of 1978, SCN pioneered the usage of satellite technology and completed construction of its local satellite earth station in April 1979. This prefigured the beginning of AFN's satellite broadcasts (SATNET) by three years, when its main facilities in Los Angeles started satellite delivery.

Until March 1989, SCN's main difficulty was over copyright issues with Panamanian television networks (RPC and TVN, later joined by Telemetro). The situation changed when the country was gearing up for the general election followed by the aftershocks of a coup attempt. SCN was caught between the Panamanian and American governments, and had a central role in the events in case the bases were invaded. The situation stabilized on January 5, 1990. During the temporary suspension of Panamanian media outlets, SCN was the only television channel authorized to operate until RPC resumed on Christmas Day.

SCN ceased operations in two phases, with local origination ending on July 1, 1999 and relays ceasing completely on December 31, 1999, when the Panama Canal returned to Panamanian control. Its equipment was relocated to the United States and Puerto Rico.

In 2001, following failed attempts at creating a regional educational station, the Panamanian government set a date for the fate of the former SCN frequencies, July 10. However, no company successfully bid for those licenses, leading channels 7 and 9 in the capital zone to be given for a bid, Tele 7 (now Oye TV) and TVMax, both starting in 2005.
