= Kafu Banton =

Panamanian singer

- Born: Zico Alberto Garibaldi Roberts; June 3, 1979 (age 45); Colón, Panama
- Occupations: Singer; songwriter
- Musical career
- Genres: Spanish dancehall

Zico Alberto Garibaldi Roberts (born June 3, 1979), better known by his stage name Kafu Banton, is a Panamanian singer and songwriter of Spanish dancehall.

== Life ==
Kafu was born in 1979 in Cólon, Panama City. The name is expired in Kafu following football star Cafu and Banton comes from one of the greatest exponents of reggae, Buju Banton, which when fused form Kafu Banton.

During his studies at a school in Panama City, he came to know a relative of one of the best Panamanian reggae artists, Ernesto Brown known as Apache Ness, who introduced reggae vibe, then published in different competitions to gender national in mid October 1996, he won first place in a competition held in the city, and had the opportunity to record their first single titled Vivo en el Ghetto launched in 2004.

== History ==
The name Kafu originates from football star Cafu and Banton comes from one of the greatest exponents of reggae, Buju Banton. This combined forms his stage name Kafu Banton.

During his studies at a school in Ciudad de Colón he met a relative of one of the best Panamanian reggae artists, Ernesto Brown (known as Apache Ness), who introduced him to the reggae scene. He then made himself known by participating in different reggae contests and competitions at the national level. In mid-October 1996 he won first place on a contest held in a local nightclub, providing the opportunity to record his first single, Madman, under the Spanish Oil production, headed by Rodney " El Chombo" Clark.

Soon he participated in other productions like "Stories of the Crypt 2", and "Stories of the Crypt 3", produced by Oilers Music. These productions caught the greater attention of the public. During this period, in which reggae music was experiencing one of its best moments, Kafu Banton, along with other recognized artists like Apache Ness y Los Sensacionales, Calito Soul, Papachan, Original Dan, and Bigaman created the group "One Love, One Blood".

In 1998 Kafu decided to leave the label Oilers Music, and began to work with producer Pucho Bustamante, under the label Proarsain. Under this new label, Kafu participated in several successful productions like: Creation, Los Dementes, Da'Crew and Sin Censura.

In 2000, after gaining experience under Oilers Music, and Proarsain, Kafu produced his first album, "The Best of Me", which contains hits Pato, Way Way, Ya toy cansao, The System and Good Bye. This album took him to the international stage, making presentations in Central America and the United States. In 2004 he released his second album entitled "Vivo en el Ghetto". Kafu Banton also arrives in Spain where he collaborates with Spanish reggae star Morodo.
