= 819 line =

1940s French analogue high-definition television system

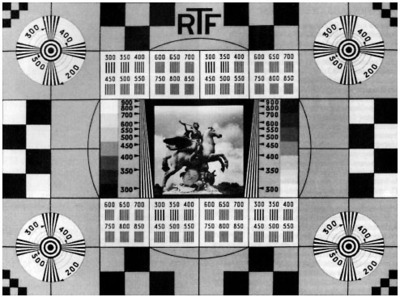
"Marly Horses" test card from RTF Alger (predecessor of TV1 Algeria) from 1956, originally in 819 lines.

819-line was an analog monochrome TV system developed and used in France as television broadcast resumed after World War II. Transmissions started in 1949 and were active up to 1985, although limited to France, Belgium and Luxembourg. It is associated with CCIR System E and F.

== History ==
When Europe resumed TV transmissions after World War II (i.e. in the late 1940s and early 1950s) most countries standardized on 625-line television systems. The two exceptions were the British 405-line system, which had already been introduced in 1936, and the French 819-line system. During the 1940s René Barthélemy had already reached 1,015 lines and even 1,042 lines.

On November 20, 1948, François Mitterrand, the then Secretary of State for Information, decreed a broadcast standard of 819 lines developed by Henri de France; broadcasting began at the end of 1949 in this higher definition format. It was used in France by TF1, and in Monaco by Tele Monte Carlo.

Some 819-line TV sets were available, like the Grammont 504-A-31 from 1951 and the Philips 14TX100 multi-standard 625/819-line TV from 1952.

The system was also adopted (with limited bandwidth, affecting image resolution) in 1953 in Belgium by RTB and in 1955 in Luxembourg by Télé-Luxembourg.

Broadcasts were discontinued in Belgium in February 1968, and in Luxembourg in September 1971. Despite some attempts to create a color SECAM version of the 819-line system, France gradually abandoned the system in favor of the Europe-wide standard of 625-lines with the final 819-line transmissions taking place in Paris from the Eiffel Tower on 19 July 1983.

Tele Monte Carlo in Monaco were the last broadcasters to transmit 819-line television, closing down their transmitter in 1985.

== Electronovision ==
The 819-line video standard also saw some use in the United States, by the Electronovision motion picture process. It was developed by producer and entrepreneur H. William "Bill" Sargent, Jr. around 1964 to produce a handful of motion pictures, theatrical plays, and specials in the 1960s and early 1970s using videotape recording utilizing the higher resolution afforded by the 819-line video standard for production, later transferred to film via kinescope for theatrical release.

Electronovision used conventional B&W television cameras (RCA TK-60 cameras were used) and Ampex 2" quadruplex-format VTRs for the process that were configured to operate in the 819-line standard, which was a better fit for later transfer via a kinescope process to 35mm film than the usual 525-line 30 frame per second video standard in use in the US at the time, due to the higher resolution and the 25 fps frame rate of 819-line video being closer to the resolution and 24 fps frame rate of motion picture film.

== Technical details ==
This was arguably the world's first high-definition television system, and, by today's standards, it could be called 736i (as it had 737 lines active, but one of the lines was composed of 2 halves) with a maximum theoretical resolution of 408×368 line pairs (which in digital terms can be expressed as broadly equivalent to 816×736 pixels) with a 4:3 aspect ratio. By comparison with modern digital standards, 720p is 1,280×720 pixels, of which the 4:3 portion would be 960×720 pixels, while PAL DVDs have a resolution of 720×576 pixels.

The testcards used with the system had resolution gratings that went up to 900 TV lines. However, the theoretical picture quality far exceeded the capabilities of the analogue equipment of its time, and each 819-line channel occupied a wide 14 MHz of VHF bandwidth.

General technical specifications of the broadcast television systems used with 819-lines.
Field frequency	Active picture	Field blanking	No. of broad pulses	Broad pulse width	Line frequency	Front porch	Line sync	Back porch	Active line time	Video/syncs ratio
50 Hz	737 lines	41 lines	1 per field	20.0 μs	20475 Hz	0.5 μs	2.5 μs	5.0 μs	40.8 μs	70/30

819-lines were broadcast using two CCIR systems, System E and System F.

=== System E ===
System E implementation provided very good (near HDTV) picture quality but with an uneconomical use of bandwidth; a 625/50 signal providing the same clarity as an 819-line image, but matted down 4:3 with the same number of lines, would still need nearly 6 MHz for the vision carrier alone (vs typical 5 to 6 MHz in actual use), and 5 MHz for 525/60 (vs typical 4.2 MHz), although a 405/50 transmission could get away with only 2.5 MHz (typical 3 MHz, as System A made no allowance for the Kell factor and thus had a "narrow pixel"/"tall line" appearance). Thus even an unusually crisp "standard" definition (or slightly soft 405-line) image only needed half, or even one-quarter the vision bandwidth of the 819-line system to give a "balanced" appearance, despite their lower overall resolution still seeming perfectly clear on the more affordable small-screen receivers often used in the pre-color era. With the usual additions of sound carrier and vestigial sideband the result was a combined signal that demanded approximately two to three times the bandwidth of more moderately specified standards, even when colour was added to them (as the color subcarrier resides within the luma signal space).

System E specifications
CCIR System	Lines	Frame rate	Channel bandwidth (MHz)	Visual bandwidth (MHz)	Sound carrier offset	Vestigial sideband	Vision mod.	Sound mod.
E	819	25	14	10	±11.15 (+ on odd numbered channels; − on even numbered channels)	2.00	Pos.	AM

=== System F ===
System F was an adapted 819-line system used in Belgium and Luxembourg as an answer to the bandwidth problem, using only half the original vision bandwidth and approximately half the sound carrier offset. It allowed French 819-line programming to squeeze into the 7 MHz VHF broadcast channels used in those neighboring countries, albeit with a substantial loss of horizontal resolution (408×737 effective); although this still offered approximately twice the actual clarity of 405-line System A (twice the lines, roughly the same horizontal definition), the contrast between vertical and horizontal resolution would have made it seem perceptually softer than a 625 line signal with the same bandwidth. Use of System F was discontinued in Belgium in February 1968, and in Luxembourg in September 1971.

System F specifications
CCIR System	Lines	Frame rate	Channel bandwidth (MHz)	Visual bandwidth (MHz)	Sound carrier offset	Vestigial sideband	Vision mod.	Sound mod.
F	819	25	7	5	+5.5	0.75	Pos.	AM

== Countries and territories that used the 819-line system ==
This is a list of nations that used the 819-line system for television broadcasting:

- France (TF1)
- Belgium (RTB)
- Luxemburg (Télé-Luxembourg)
- Monaco (Tele Monte Carlo)
- French Algeria (prior to independence)
- Saar Protectorate (before 1957)

== See also ==
- CCIR System E
- CCIR System F
