= 480i =

Standard-definition video mode

SDTV resolution by nation: countries using 480i are in green.

480i is the video mode used for standard-definition digital video in most of the Americas (with the exception of Argentina, Paraguay, and Uruguay), Japan, South Korea, Taiwan, the Philippines, and Myanmar. The other common standard definition digital standard, used in the rest of the world, is 576i.

It originated from the need for a standard to digitize analog 525-line TV (defined in BT.601) and is now used for digital TV broadcasts and home appliances such as game consoles and DVD disc players.

The 480 identifies a vertical resolution of 480 lines, and the i identifies it as an interlaced resolution. The field rate, which is 60 Hz (or 59.94 Hz when used with NTSC color), is sometimes included when identifying the video mode, i.e. 480i60; another notation, endorsed by both the International Telecommunication Union in BT.601 and SMPTE in SMPTE 259M, includes the frame rate, as in 480i/30.

Although related, it should not be confused with the analog "525 lines" resolution, mandated by CCIR Systems M and J and usually paired with NTSC color. This association explains why 480i is sometimes inaccurately called "NTSC", even though NTSC only exists in the analog domain.

== Technical details ==
Interlaced scanning: display of odd (green) and even (red) scanlines, and line return blanking periods (dotted)

For analog NTSC, there are a total of 525 scanning lines per frame of which originally 483 lines were visible (241.5 visible lines per field + 21 lines of vertical blanking per field = 483 + 42 = 525 lines per frame) and later 480 (240 complete lines per field). [For quad video recording systems, the math suggests 15 transverse head passes, each consisting of 16 lines of video, are required to complete one field.]

A full frame consists of two fields. One field contains the odd-numbered lines and the other contains the even ones. By convention an NTSC video frame is considered to start with an even field followed by an odd field. The disparity of the line numbering compared to other systems is solved by defining the line numbering to start five equalizing pulses (or 2 and a half lines) earlier than on all other systems, including Systems A (405-line) and E (819-line) even though they had no equalizing pulses, on the first equalizing pulse following an active line or half line. This has the effect of placing a half line of video at the end of the even (first) field and the beginning of the odd (second field). Thus the line numbers correspond to the real lines of the video frame. On all other systems, the field was considered to start with the falling edge of the first field pulse which gave the confusing position that the odd field (first) had a half a line of video occupying the latter half of a whole line and ended with a whole line of video but half a scanning line (and vice versa for the even field). The NTSC convention solved this confusion.

For DV-NTSC only 480 lines are used. The digitally transmitted horizontal resolution is usually 720 samples (which includes 16 samples for the horizontal sync and horizontal blanking) or 704 visible pixels with an aspect ratio of 4:3 (with vertically rectangular pixels) and therefore a display resolution of 640 × 480 (VGA); that is standard-definition television (SDTV) with a 4:3 aspect ratio (with square pixels).

The field rate (not the frame rate) is usually (60/1.001) = 59.94 hertz for color TV and is often incorrectly rounded up to 60 Hz. There are several conventions for written shorthands for the combination of resolution and rate: 480i60, 480i/30 (EBU/SMPTE always use frame rate to specify interlaced formats) and 480/60i. 480i is usually used in countries that conventionally use NTSC (most of the Americas and Japan), because the 525 transmitted lines at 60 hertz of analogue NTSC contain 480 visible ones.

In each case of the use of the ‘60’ terminology, it is merely shorthand for 59.94, to differentiate it from 30 (29.97) or 24 (23.976).

Color information is stored using the YCbCr color space (different from NTSC that used YIQ) with 4:2:2 sampling (also different from NTSC) and following Rec. 601 colorimetry.

480i can be transported by all major digital television formats (ATSC, DVB and ISDB) and on DVD.

== See also ==
- Enhanced-definition television (EDTV)
- List of common display resolutions
- 4320p, 2160p, 1080p, 1080i, 720p, 576p, 576i, 480p, 360p, 240p
