= Telebarú =

Regional television station in Panama (1964–1967)

Telebarú (also stylized Tele-Barú or without the accent) was the first regional television station in Panama. It broadcast from the city of David in Chiriquí Province near the border with Costa Rica. It was independent from the two extant television stations in the country at the time, Tevedos and RPC Televisión, operating for little more than two years in the 1960s.

== History ==
In the early years of television in Panama, Chiriquí received the nearest RPC relayer on channel 6, but with precarious image quality. In February 1964, plans to launch a dedicated station for the region were already being set, this time with a station that would relay part of Tevedos's programming, as the station had no relay in the country's west.

Telebarú was the first television station to be established outside of the central area. Its founders were Samudio and Manuel Ramón Guerra, with Sabas Abad Villegas Belilla in its founding staff. In August 1964, the station was conducting test broadcasts. The station opened on November 1, 1964, and operated from 4:45pm to 11pm every day. In March 1965, Chilean-born Eduardo Sampson, who had been living in the country for some time, moved to David, as he was appointed by the station as its sales director, while also presenting some programs.

One of its most popular productions was a children's show called Tío Barba, created by Sabas, which lasted throughout the station's existence and became a hit due to its originality and variety of content. Sabas later moved to Panama City, the national capital, after being hired by Publicentro de Panamá in 1968 to make advertising jingles for Panamanian television.

The station closed its operations on January 4, 1967, due to economic reasons.
