= Television in Mauritius =

Television was introduced to Mauritius in 1964. Terrestrial television is entirely controlled by the Mauritius Broadcasting Corporation. Subscription television also operates (My.T, DStv and Canal+).

== History ==
The Mauritius Broadcasting Service signed an agreement with British company Thomson Television International (also known as Television International Enterprises Limited) in 1963, to provide assistance for the launch of the television service. In view of this, MBS (renamed MBC per a 1964 ordinance) started work on a new Broadcasting House in October 1963, to accommodate both radio and television. A transmitter was already installed by the end of the year at Malherbes and later conducted field tests which were all successful.

The broadcaster, renamed MBC in 1964 per a government ordinance, started broadcasting from Curepipe on 8 June 1964, becoming regular on 8 January 1965. During the first year of operation, the relays stations were established. A French-backed satellite earth station was put into operation in December 1975; the same month SECAM colour telecasts began.

Since the inception of television in the country, MBC has held a monopoly. The complex ethnic makeup of the country enables MBC to broadcast in virtually all languages spoken in the island, as well as all religions. MBC covers all key religious festivals, which in 2008, was estimated to be at around a thousand airings per year. According to Jean-Claude Antoine, in 2008, he said that "God, if he exists, cannot understand the Mauritian television equation". The three MBC channels broadcast in languages such as Mauritian Creole, the national language, English (official language), French, Mandarin and Indian languages (Hindi, Urdu, Telugu, Tamil, Marathi). Indian soap operas were unanimously popular among the several groups, but representing India's reality instead of the Mauritian one. Also popular was Kel Fami! (What a Family), a sitcom spoken in Creole, the only language spoken by all Mauritians.

Being a monopoly, MBC is also known for rejecting certain topics as it is bound for political interference. Still in 2008, some songs were rejected from appearing on Emtel Bonnto Klip. When political power changes, so does the network boss. A historical example of MBC's poor treatment of Mauritian musicians was with Kaya. MBC only talked about him when he died in jail in 1999.

== Digital terrestrial television ==
MBC started broadcasting early for African standards (in 2005). In 2013, 75 to 80% of Mauritian households already had a digital terrestrial receiver.

== Pay-TV ==
Mauritius Telecom owns a pay-TV service and, since 2023, is the local partner for DStv Stream.

Canal+ operates its own service, Canal+ Maurice, known until September 2025 as MC Vision.

== See also ==
- List of television channels in Mauritius
