= ATV (Suriname) =

Television channel in Suriname

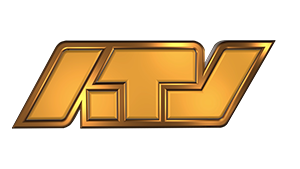
- Country: Suriname
- Broadcast area: Suriname; Guyana
- Headquarters: Paramaribo

Programming
- Languages: Dutch; English
- Picture format: 480i (NTSC and ATSC)

Ownership
- Owner: Telesur

History
- Launched: 1983

Links
- Website: ATV website

Algemene Televisie Verzorging (ATV) is a television station in Suriname. It was founded in 1983, and was the second television station in Suriname. It is operated by the state's Telecommunication Company Telesur. In August 2014, ATV made work of it to switch from analog to digital TV. The network uses the ATSC standard. ATV's picture formats are 480p (SDTV) 720p (HDTV).

== Programming ==
=== ATV programs ===
- ATV Nieuws
- ATV Sport
- Whazzz Up?
- The Ellen DeGeneres Show
- Panorama
- Teen Magazine
- Sarnami TV
- Damkha TV
- Super Hit Video
- Super Hit Classics
- Glory 17
- The haves and have nots
- Worst Case Scenario with Bear Grylls
- Info Act
- BBC News
- CNN News
- Suri Tunes
- Steven Reyme Ministries
- Fitness
- G.I.Joe Sigma
- Documentaries
- The Rubing Health Foundation
- ATV WK Journaal (Alleen tijdens WK)
- Luku Dosu
- 1 voor 12
- Trekking: Tek.2/Double Tek.2/Match.3/High.5
- Devious Maids
- In Gesprek Met (Speaking With)
- The New Games Plus
- Logos International
- Project Runway All Stars
- The Amazing Race
- School TV
- The Chronicles Of Riddick
- Bribi Ministries
- Soeng Ngie's Keukengeheimen
- Gods Rivier Ministries
- Kinderfilms
- X-Games Hot Wheels Double Dare
- Fish Finder
- Top Gear
- Maranatha Ministries
- Wonderen vandaag (Miracles Today)
- Kimmy's Land
- Everybody Hates Chris
- Saving Hope
- Youth Outreach
- Player Attack
- Tv.films
- Owru Pokuman Fu Sranan
- Tekenfilms
- De Levende Steen Gemeente (The Living Stone Community)
- KidzTori
- Revue : Binnenlands Weekoverzicht (National Week in Review)
- Voedselveiligheid En Voedingsziekten (Food Safety and Food-borne Illness)

=== TV2 programs ===
- Tempo Networks
- ATV Nieuws
- ATV Sport
- Panorama
- Suri Tunes
- Info Act
- BBC News
- CNN News
- Teletubbies
- 1 en 1 = 3
- Hell's Kitchen
- Kuku Tori
- NBA Action
