= CCIR System E =

819-line analog television transmission format

CCIR System E is an analog broadcast television system used in France and Monaco, associated with monochrome 819-line high resolution broadcasts. Transmissions started in 1949 and ended in 1985.

== System E specifications ==
Some of the important specs are listed below:

- Frame rate: 25 Hz
- Interlace: 2/1
- Field rate: 50 Hz
- Lines/frame: 819
- Line rate: 20.475 kHz
- Visual bandwidth: 10 MHz
- Vision modulation: Positive
- Preemphasis: none
- Sound modulation: AM
- Sound offset: +11.15 MHz on odd numbered channels, -11.15 MHz on even numbered channels
- Channel bandwidth: 14 MHz

System E implementation provided very good (near HDTV) picture quality but with an uneconomical use of bandwidth. With the usual additions of sound carrier and vestigial sideband the result was a combined signal that demanded approximately two to three times the bandwidth of more moderately specified standards, even when colour was added to them (as the color subcarrier resides within the Luma signal space).

For this reason, France gradually abandoned it in favor of the 625-lines standard, implementing System L with SECAM color.

The final 819-line transmissions in Metropolitan France took place in Paris, from the Eiffel Tower, on 19 July 1983. TMC in Monaco were the last broadcasters to transmit 819-line television, closing down their System E transmitter in 1985.

Television channels were arranged as follows:

Ch	Picture (MHz)	Sound (MHz)
F2	52.40	41.25
F4	65.55	54.40
F5	164.00	175.15
F6	173.40	162.25
F7	177.15	188.30
F8	186.55	175.40
F8a	185.25	174.10
F9	190.30	201.45
F10	199.70	188.55
F11	203.45	214.60
F12	212.85	201.70

== See also ==
- CCIR System F
- Broadcast television systems
- Television transmitter
- Transposer
