= Rapar Broadcasting Network =

- Paramaribo; Suriname
- Broadcast area: Paramaribo
- Frequencies: 91,3 MHz; 92,1 MHz; 89,7 MHz (all in Paramaribo)

Programming
- Languages: Dutch, Sranan Tongo
- Format: Full service

Ownership
- Owner: Pierkhan Family

History
- First air date: January 28, 1957 (radio); December 1997 (television)

Rapar Broadcasting Network (RBN) is a Surinamese media company. Its operations began in 1957 with the founding of Rapar, a radio station; its name was taken from the initial syllables of Radio Paramaribo, broadcasting in both Dutch and Sarnami Hindustani. Currently, RBN controls three radio stations, Dagblad Suriname, a television station (RBN TV) and an advertising bureau (Acme Service).

== History ==
=== Early years ===
Rapar, Suriname's first private radio station, was established by Gilly Hillers, Walter Lim A Po and Iwan de Vries on January 28, 1957. It changed its location several times; after starting at Anton Dragentenweg in Paramaribo, it moved to Neumanpad, in the former AVROS studios in Gravenstraat (1964), later to Coppenamestraat (1980) and, since then, at Mr. J. Lachmonstraat.

Rapar's first announcer was Cyriel Karg. A year after founding, Wilfred Lionarons took over director duties from William Cromwell. Lionarons was also Rapar's founder since the beginning. He sold the station in 1976 to Rashid Pierkhan, who subsequently transferred the post of director to his son Faried Pierkhan.

=== Suspension (1982-1984) ===
After the February 1980 coup d'état led by Desi Bouterse, private stations in Suriname were authorized to continue operating under the condition imposed by the military that its listeners would be "positively moderated". During the Rambocus coup of 11 March 1982, Rapar was among the stations that had its broadcasts suspended for hours. When the December murders took place later that year, Rapar had to halt its activities, same for other private outlets, namely Radio Apintie and Dagblad De West. The suspension was lifted for the three affected outlets on May 3, 1984, however, the early years post-suspension were marked by strong censorship from the military regime. The ban remained for Radio ABC.

=== Conflict with Sasur ===
In 2006, Stichting voor Auteursrechten in Suriname (Sasur) presented court action to Rapar. At the time, Suriname was, along with Haiti, one of the few countries in the Caribbean region that did not respect artists' copyrights. Sasur won the suit on December 1, 2006, where Rapar paid SRD 1,000 in damages for violating their rights. This was followed by a lengthy conflict involving apprehensions and lawsuits. A settlement was agreed in 2013 between both parties.

== RBN TV ==
RBN operates a television station on channel 5, which largely caters the Surinamese Indian group, the country's largest community. As of 2010, the station had Kal Aaj Aur Kal (Yesterday, Today and Tomorrow) broadcast during prime time, presented by corporate director Faried Pierkhan and sponsored by the ACME insurance company, owned by the Rapar group. The station panders to Indian nostalgia through music videos, TV series and Bollywood movies. At the time, the station had a treasure trove of Bollywood titles, including new releases such as Slumdog Millionaire. Pierkhan worked with Indian agents who were in charge of taking care of the rights of the movies they broadcast.

=== Technical information ===
Channel	Content
5.1	RBN TV
5.2	Alpha Channel
5.4	B-Desi TV
