= NBS Sport =

Ugandan television network

NBS Sport Uganda
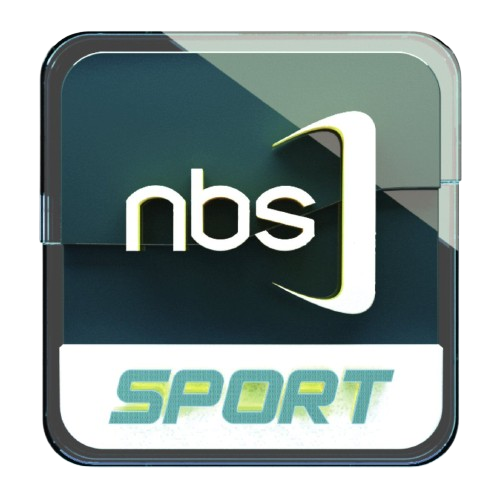
- Country: Uganda
- Headquarters: Next Media Park

Programming
- Languages: English, Luganda
- Picture format: 1080i HDTV (downscaled to 16:9 576i for the SDTV feed), Colour

Ownership
- Owner: Next Media Services
- Key people: Kin Kariisa (Group CEO)
- Sister channels: NBS Television, Sanyuka TV

History
- Launched: 8 June 2022; 4 years ago

Links
- Website: nbssport.co.ug

Availability

Terrestrial
- (Startimes), DSTV, Free to Air, GOtv

NBS Sport is a Ugandan sports television network based in Kampala, Uganda.

== Overview ==
The channel was launched on 8 June 2022 and it started broadcasting on that same day.

The station is known for its focus on sports 24/7, with covering live sports events in Uganda like the National Basketball League, Pool Table competitions, Uganda Boxing Champions League, Uganda Rugby League among others.

== Location ==
Its headquarter is located at Next Media Park, Plot 13, summit view Road, Kampala, Uganda.
