= TVN (Panamanian TV network) =

Televisora Nacional
- Broadcast area: Panama

Programming
- Picture format: 1080i HDTV

Ownership
- Owner: Televisora Nacional S.A. (TVN Media)
- Sister channels: TVMAX

History
- Launched: April 23, 1962

Links
- Website: www.tvn-2.com

Availability

Terrestrial
- Analog VHF: Channel 2 (listings may vary)
- Digital UHF: Channel 45

Televisora Nacional (abbreviated as TVN) is a television network headquartered in Panama City, Panama, with repeaters throughout the country. The stations broadcast in the NTSC format and DVB-T for Panama City. In DVB-T format it was the only TV station in HD for most of the day and they also broadcast in a sub-channel two hours behind programming from the main channel(DVB-T only), being the first TV station to have this service.

Main programming consists of local news, telenovelas, and Panamanian reality shows called Produccion Nacional (national productions). TVN rarely broadcasts sports, however, they launched sister station TV Max channel 9 to specialize in those programs.

== History ==
With help and participation from state-owned and foreign companies, the National Television and Radio System (Sistema Nacional de Radio y Televisión) was awarded a license in 1957, with help from local entrepreneurs and broadcasts officially commenced on April 23, 1962. Its commercial name at the time was Tevedos. The station had technical support from ABC International Television Inc. with a heavy emphasis on musical shows and American imports. It broadcast from 2pm to midnight, having a half-hour news bulletin at 10pm. In 1964, Tevedos planned to enable some of its programs to air on Telebarú, an independent television station in David, a city in the country's west. In 1965, the channel was fined for presenting artists without being subject to censorship.

In 1967, a mobile unit was acquired, thus allowing the expansion of live events and shows seen on TVN, like El Show del Mediodía, La Lotería and horse races from the Presidente Remón horse track.

In 1969, when the country was starting to use satellite TV technology, TVN was amongst the first to air the Apollo Moon landings. In 1972, it became the first channel in the country to air in color. Using the NTSC system.

In 1978, TVN transmitted their first FIFA World Cup, but on delay; rival RPC had the rights to air it live.

TVN was faithful to the military regime, unlike competing broadcaster RPC.

In August 2001, TVN premiered Linda Labé, Panama's first locally-made telenovela. Midway through its run, it received technical support from Colombian actor Luis Mesa, who changed the storyline. It also planned two further telenovelas for 2002.

TVN produced three historical documentary miniseries in 2003, portraying the birth of Panama, in line with the country's centennial: El Caudillo, Llegó Matea and Con ardientes fulgores de gloria. All of these programs were archived at the Ernesto J. Castillero National Library.

== Regular programming ==
The channel mainly broadcasts telenovelas and news. TVN has a separate news division under the name of "TVN Noticias", which publishes daily news content to its website and to its television news programs.

== Location ==
Current main offices and studios are located in Vía Ricardo J. Alfaro, Panama City, Panama, better known as Tumba Muerto, sharing installations with FETV (Panama), and sister channel TVMax. TVN was formerly located alongside the Vía Transistmica, and had a studio alongside Avenida Balboa called Teatro ASSA.
