= TVMax =

Commercial TV station in Panama

TV Max
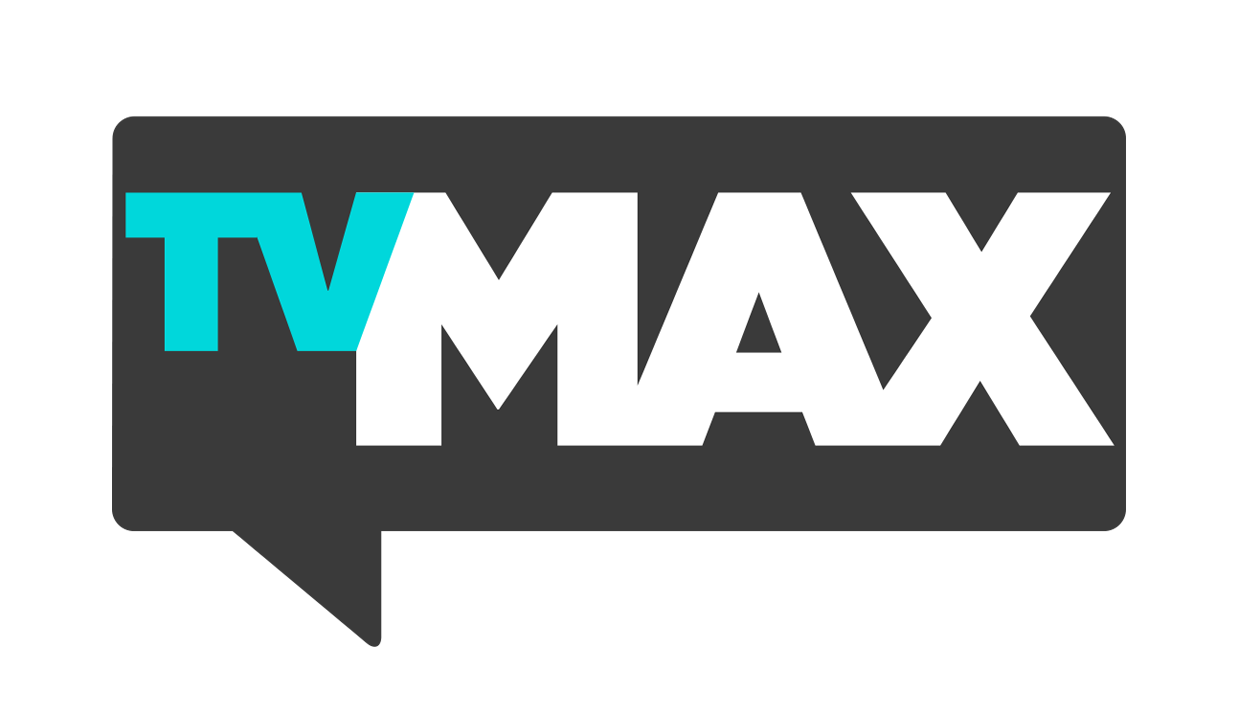
- Broadcast area: Panama City, Panama

Programming
- Picture format: 1080i HDTV

Ownership
- Owner: Televisora Nacional S.A. (TVN Media)
- Sister channels: TVN

History
- Launched: April 3, 2005

Links
- Website: www.tvmax-9.com

Availability

Terrestrial
- Analog VHF: Channel 9 (All repeaters on same frequency)
- Digital UHF: Channel 45

TVMax is a commercial privately owned TV station in Panama City, Panama that is available all over the country. It is owned by TVN Media which owns flagship and sister channel TVN

This channel was created to absorb all the sports programming of TVN. A sports news program was created. It also received most of the series, sitcoms and reality shows from TVN, and acquired new ones. TV MAX is aimed towards the male audience and people who like sports and foreign TV series. It has become a very popular TV station in the country.

== History ==
TVMax came to be as a result of the auctioning of the frequencies formerly used by AFN station SCN TV, which broadcast in the Canal Zone and shut down due to the return of the control of the Panama Canal to the Panamanian government. The auction failed, prompting TVN to buy an adjacent frequency (channel 9) for the sum of over US$2 million on August 21, 2001. The strategy had to be carefully analyzed due to factors such as the economic recession of the time and the saturation of the television market.

The channel started broadcasting on April 3, 2005, at 6:30am, with the live broadcast of the 2005 Formula One Bahrain Grand Prix.

In its early years, the channel's original production was virtually limited, the mix of programming was intended by a Día a Día columnist to make the channel closer to RPC in its formula.
