= Henri de France =

French television inventor (1911-1986)

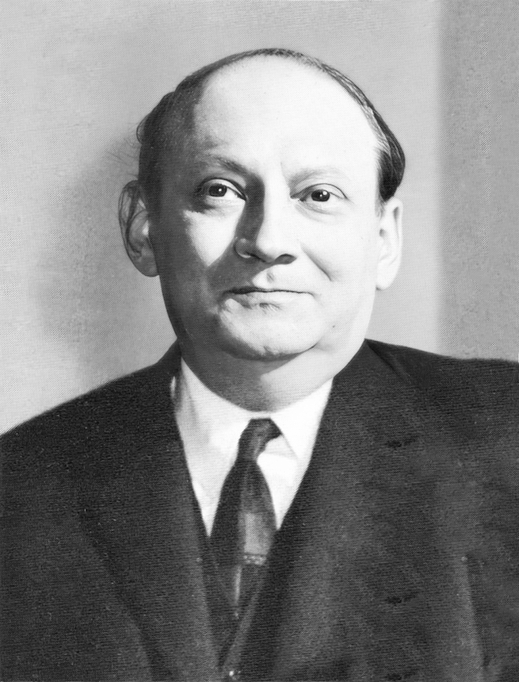
- Henri de France in 1952
- Born: 7 September 1911; Paris, France
- Died: 29 April 1986 (aged 74); Paris, France
- Burial place: Paris (cimetière du Montparnasse)
- Other names: Henri Georges de France
- Occupation: television inventor
- Known for: founder, Compagnie Générale de Télévision
- Notable work: 819 line French standard, SECAM color system, HD-MAC high-definition standard

Henri Georges de France (7 September 1911 Paris – 29 April 1986 Paris) was a pioneering French television inventor. His inventions include the 819 line French standard and the SECAM color system.

On December 6, 1931, De France founded the Compagnie Générale de Télévision in Le Havre, making television sets with a vertical definition of 60 lines. In February 1932, De France made several transmissions over a distance of 7 km from the "Radio-Normandie" station in Fécamp. These signals were received by a few people located over 100 km away. In October 1932, he achieved a definition of 120 lines. In 1956, he patented the SECAM color television system. On October 1, 1967 at 2:15pm CET, la deuxième chaîne switched from black and white to color using SECAM.

De France is interred in Paris (cimetière du Montparnasse).

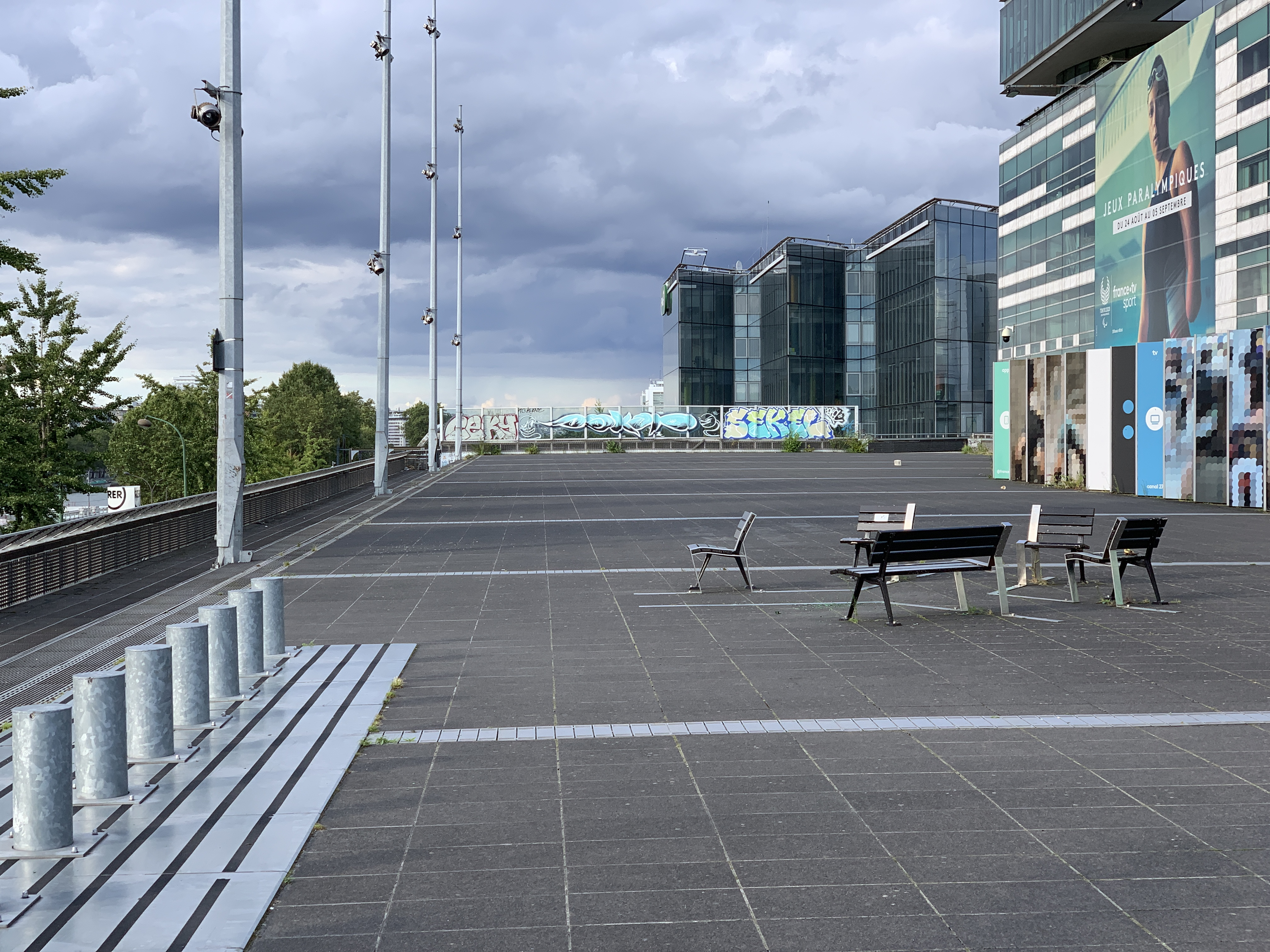
Esplanade Henri de France, Paris

The public passage near France Télévisions buildings in Paris is named Esplanade Henri de France.

== Patents ==
- Apparatus for determining a direction, US 2513849, issued 4 July 1950
- Television device for recording motion pictures thereof, US 2531031, issued 21 November 1950
- Amplifier system, US 2589542, issued 18 March 1952
- Communication system between two stations linked by television, US 2637022, issued 28 April 1953
- Television system, US 2700700, issued 25 January 1955
- Color television, US 2876278, issued 3 March 1959
