= STVS =

- Country: Suriname
- Broadcast area: National
- Headquarters: Paramaribo

Programming
- Language: Dutch
- Picture format: 480i (NTSC and ATSC)

History
- Launched: 20 October 1965

Links
- Website: STVS website

Availability

Terrestrial
- VHF: Channel 8

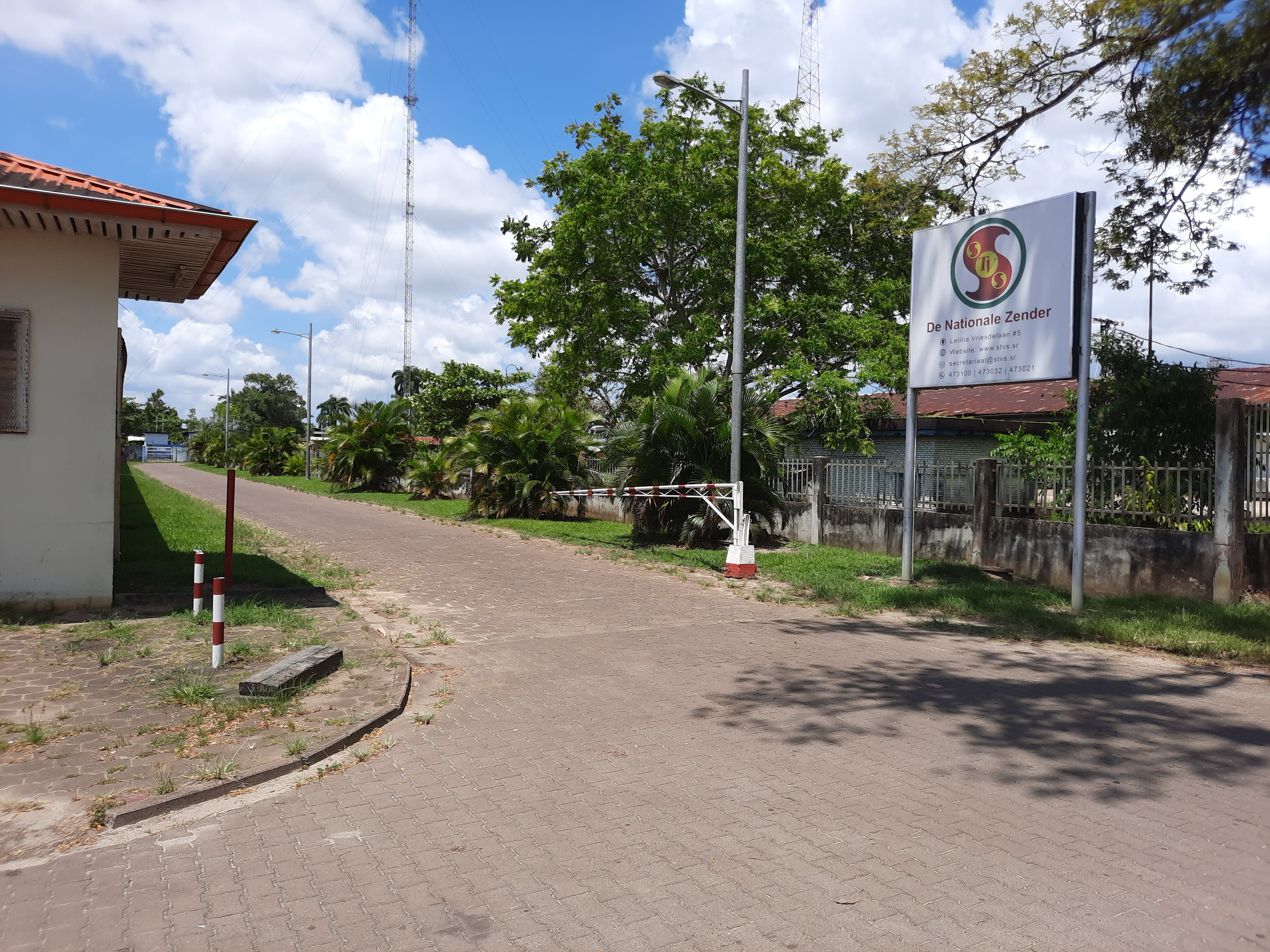
STVS logo on the sign on the right

STVS (Surinaamse Televisie Stichting) is a television network in Suriname and was founded in 1965 by Prime Minister Johan Adolf Pengel. It broadcasts in the Dutch language and it is owned by the government. It is headquartered in Paramaribo, Suriname. The picture format of the STVS television network is 480i (SDTV).

== History ==
Television was first trialed in Suriname in 1958, at the Kersten firm in Paramaribo. In 1961, Frits Pengel of the Dutch omroep VARA (the current BNNVARA) wrote a plan to start television broadcasts in Suriname. The plan mainly consisted of an argument that television was no longer destined for industrialized countries. Pengel did not have a good relationship with the then Prime Minister Emanuels and the plan was shelved for the time being. This changed when Jopie Pengel took office as Prime Minister in 1963; both are related, but not closely related. The new Prime Minister was interested in his plan and asked Frits Pengel to write an additional report. This came after an orientation trip to Curaçao and Trinidad, where television broadcasts had started a short time earlier. Ultimately, it led to the founding of STVS in February 1964. On 24 February 1964, the Surinamese government founded the Surinaamse Televisie Stichting (STVS) and ordered the construction of a studio. The studio was opened on 1 October 1965, and on the same day trial broadcasts were started. Regular broadcasts started on 20 October 1965 on channel 8. First director of STVS was Frits Pengel, who had taken a television broadcasting course in the Netherlands. Pengel would remain director of STVS until 1994.

The STVS facilities were located in the Cultuurtuin, just next to the Suriname Stadium, later called the André Kamperveen Stadium. While radio connections were not yet possible at that time, it was possible to report on football matches in the stadium using long cables. In September 1965, construction of the television station was completed and Philips equipment was brought in and installed; for the electronics group it meant opening up a new market for television sets. The official commissioning took place on October 20, 1965. Since then it has been broadcast daily. Over the decades, television reception among households in Suriname expanded rapidly in proportion to the region. In addition to STVS, commercial channels are also allowed in the system. Full-color TV since 1977.

On the night of May 10 to 11, 1993, an attack took place in which a handful of masked armed men entered the studio and assaulted the staff and doused them with diesel oil. The attack happened a few hours after STVS broadcast live the debate in parliament, in which it was decided to replace the army leadership and appoint Arthy Gorré as the new army commander. One of the television workers was in such bad shape that he was still in hospital for treatment a week later. The television station was set on fire and burned down completely.

In Suriname the reaction was shocked; President Venetian called it "an extreme form of terror." In December 1993, a soldier was sentenced to five years in prison and three others were sentenced to three and a half years in prison. The client was not yet aware of this. It is clear that confidants of army leader Desi Bouterse were involved, including his former bodyguard Orlando Brakke. Bouterse had criticized the TV channel several times in the months before. Shortly after the attack, Frits Pengel said he called NDP leader Herrenberg with the message: "Henk, compliments. You have dealt with that thoroughly, because everything has been destroyed."

Four months after Desi Bouterse took office as president of Suriname, on November 22, 2010, STVS director Kenneth Oostburg was sent on compulsory leave. Within a few days, the broadcaster was further reorganized and two more top officials were suspended. In addition, the reorganization of the news service and the merger of STVS with the radio station SRS were announced.

On the evening of December 9, 2013, STVS was suspended due to the broadcast of an item on an edition of 10 Minuten Jeugdjournaal on the 31st anniversary of the 1982 murders. Channel director Shirley Lacking thought that all of its content should have been revised beforehand, which didn't happen that day.

In 2017, the Bouterse II government stated that it sees the STVS and the SRS as government channels for communicating with the population. For the 2018 financial year, the government has budgeted 1.7 million Surinamese dollars (193,000 euros) for both broadcasters and the National Information Institute. Programs are screened in advance to ensure they don't contain anything "offensive". For example, messages with negative treatment of the president are rejected.

== Programming ==
Frits Pengel was in charge of STVS from 1965 to 1994. In his last year he indicated that the programming could never reach the level of the BBC or NOS, but that this depended on the budget and available resources. In 1994, the programming consisted partly of what was offered, supplemented with foreign news from CNN, regional news from the Caribbean Broadcasting Union (CBU), cheap productions from Dutch television and the German Transtel, and American series and films.

== Technical information ==
As of April 2023, STVS was reported to have the most subchannels out of any Surinamese network:

Channel	Content
8.1	STVS 8.1
8.2	STVS 8.2
8.3	GOV.TV
8.4	DNA TV
8.5	Asosye TV
8.6	Binnenland Televisie
8.7	Koyeba TV
8.8	Family Media
8.9	Universele Kerk
8.11	Sonal TV

== Management ==
The following list is not complete. The management of STVS has been successively in the hands of:

- 1964-1994: Frits Pengel
- 1997: Kenneth Moerlie, acting
- ≤2004-2010: Kenneth Oostburg, in 2004 joint direction with Priet Khedoe
- 2010-2017: Shirley Lackin
- 2017–present: Steven Rodriguez
