= Ampie's Broadcasting Corporation =

Coordinates: 5.828574°N 55.176824°W

ABC
- Paramaribo; Suriname
- Broadcast area: Paramaribo, Albina, Nickerie, Moengo, Coronie, Wanica, Para
- Frequency: FM 101.7

Programming
- Languages: Dutch, Sranan Tongo
- Format: AC, CHR, Comedy, Sports, Talk

Ownership
- Owner: Henk Kamperveen

History
- First air date: December 6, 1975 (radio); December 1997 (television)
- Call sign meaning: Radio ABC

Technical information
- ERP: 10 kW

Links
- Website: https://www.abcsuriname.com

Ampie's Broadcasting Corporation Suriname N.V. commonly known as ABC, the love station or simply ABC is a Surinamese radio and television station, broadcasting from the Maystraat in Paramaribo.

== History ==
André (Ampie) Kamperveen is the founder of ABC Radio. In the 1950s he started working in advertising, he was also working for another Surinamese radio station, namely Radio Apintie where he was the news director. André's biggest dream to one day own his own station was realized on 6 December 1975 when Radio ABC went on air. Since its foundation in 1975, the station has enjoyed popularity within the radio spectrum of Suriname, delivering news, talk radio, comedy, sport and a lot of music, a combination which made ABC one of the most popular stations in the country.

== Destruction and silencing of station ==
Radio ABC served a critical platform, voicing criticism against the military regime that had taken over the country in 1980. In 1982 the regime attempted to silence the station. During the December Murders both journalists André Kamperveen and Frank Wijngaarde were murdered. Two radio stations, one of which was ABC were burned to the ground. For 11 years ABC was absent from the radio landscape of the country. A newspaper publication's office and a union building were also destroyed on the night of the abductions. On 3 May 1984, Apintie, Rapar Broadcasting Network and De West were allowed to operate again under strict control, but ABC's ban remained in place.

== Restoration ==
On 6 December 1993 ABC was restored. John and Henk Kamperveen, both Sons of André Kamperveen were busy with the restoration of the station since 1991. On December 6, the love station was back on air at its new home on 101.7 FM. The formula for the station was kept the same as it was before the december murders with some modernization.

== ABC TV ==
In December 1997 ABC launched its own television station on channel 4. Following the same ABC ideology, a group of program directors, television producers and hosts found a new home at the station. New programs were introduced to the Surinamese audience, and many DJ's who were previously only heard on the radio started developing showcases which could be seen on channel 4, which was new to Surinamese television.

Following the introduction of digital terrestrial television in Suriname, ABC started providing a two-channel multiplex on channels 4.1 and 4.2.

== The death of Johnny ==
On 1 November 2003 the longtime host and taste maker at ABC Radio, Johnny Kamperveen died at the age of 57 due to a bacterial infection. His career at the station spanned from its inception in 1975 until 2002, having been involved through all of its turbulent history. He died eight days after infection of what was possibly dengue.
