= B-MAC =

Analog video encoding system

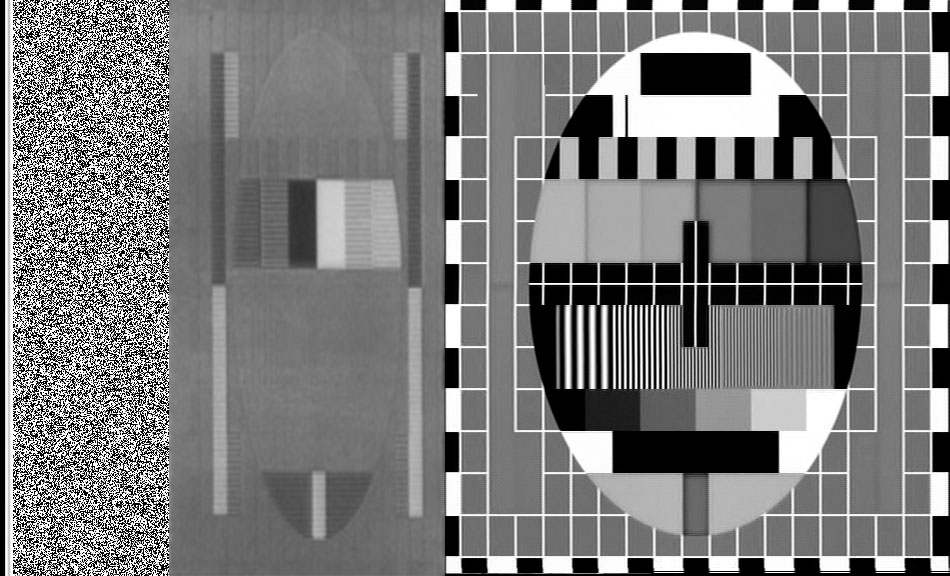
Simulated MAC signal. From left to right: digital data, chrominance and luminance separately in time

B-MAC is a form of analog video encoding, specifically a type of Multiplexed Analogue Components (MAC) encoding. MAC encoding was designed in the mid 80s for use with Direct Broadcast Satellite systems. Other analog video encoding systems include NTSC, PAL and SECAM. Unlike the Frequency-Division Multiplexing (FDM) method used in those, MAC encoding uses a Time-Division Multiplexing (TDM) method.

B-MAC was a proprietary MAC encoding used by Scientific-Atlanta for encrypting broadcast video services; the full name was "Multiple Analogue Component, Type B".

== Usage ==
Both 625 and 525 line versions of B-MAC were developed and used.

This system was used in South Africa by Multichoice, and Australia by Optus (for TVRO until 2000).

B-MAC was used for satellite broadcasts of the American Forces Radio and Television Service from the early 1980s until 1996-1997 when the analogue standard was replaced by the digital PowerVu system.

B-MAC was used for direct to home satellite applications up to the mid-1990s when Primestar switched to an all-digital delivery system. It was also used in the US around the same time for C-band satellite feeds of live Pay-per-view events for reception by local cable TV operators to distribute to their subscribers, using equipment from Scientific-Atlanta.

== Technical details ==
MAC transmits luminance and chrominance data separately in time rather than separately in frequency (as other analog television formats do, such as composite video). B-MAC uses teletext-style non-return-to-zero (NRZ) signaling with a capacity of 1.625 Mbit/s. The video and audio/data signals are therefore combined at baseband.

For audio, a format similar to NICAM was transmitted digitally rather than as an FM subcarrier.

The MAC standard included a standard scrambling system, EuroCrypt, a precursor to the standard DVB-CSA encryption system.

In MAC color is encoded using the YPbPr color space. Luma ($Y'$) is derived from red, green, and blue ($R', G', B'$) after gamma-correction (formula similar to PAL): $Y'= 0.2997R' + 0.587G' + 0.1145B'$

Chrominance is computed based on $B-Y$ and $R-Y$ differences, generating two compressed and weighted color-difference signals, $P{\scriptstyle\text{B}}$ and $P{\scriptstyle\text{R}}$.

The $Y'$ signal range is between -0.5 and 0.5 volts while $P{\scriptstyle\text{B}}$ and $P{\scriptstyle\text{R}}$ signals vary between -0.65 to 0.65 volts.

The following table lists the main technical parameters of B-MAC variants:

	B-MAC	
Frame Frequency	29.97	25
Lines per frame	525	625
Aspect Ratio	4:3 / 16:9	
Display Gamma	2.2	2.8
Primary chromaticities (x y)	Similar to NTSC 1953: Red 0.67, 0.33; Green 0.21, 0.71; Blue 0.14, 0.08	
White point (x y)	D65	
Luminance	$Y'= 0.2997R' + 0.587G' + 0.1145B'$	
Colour difference	$I' = -0.27 (B' - Y') + 0.74 (R' - Y')$ $Q' = -0.41 (B' - Y') + 0.48 (R' - Y')$	$R' - Y' = 0.701R'-0.587G'-0.114B'$ $B' - Y' =-0.299R'-0.587G'-0.886B'$
Transmitted chrominance	$P'{\scriptstyle\text{B}} = 0.694 (B'-Y')$ $P'{\scriptstyle\text{R}} = 0.926 (R'- Y')$	
Sampling frequency (MHz)	14.318	14.219
Uncompressed bandwidth (MHz)	4.2	5.0
Luminance clock periods	750	
Chrominance clock periods	375	

== See also ==
- Analog high-definition television systems
- PAL, what MAC technology tried to replace
- SECAM, what MAC technology tried to replace
- A-MAC
- B-MAC
- C-MAC
- D-MAC
- E-MAC
- S-MAC
- D2-MAC
- HD-MAC, an early high-definition television standard allowing for 2048x1152 resolution.
- DVB-S, MAC technology was replaced by this standard
- DVB-T, MAC technology was replaced by this standard
