= A-MAC =

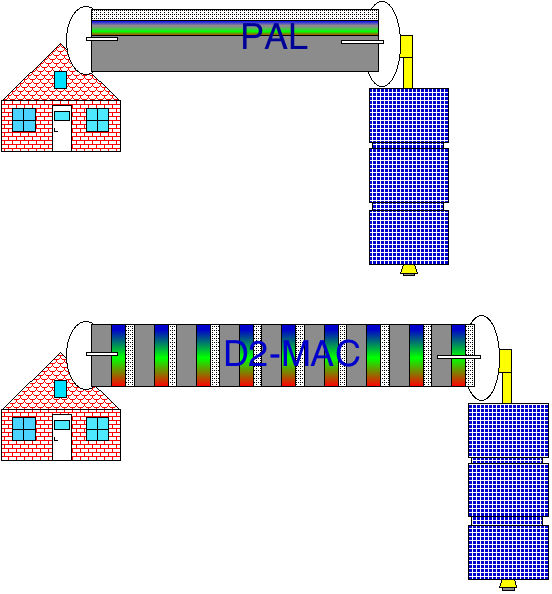
The simultaneous PAL transmission of all TV-picture elements and the multiplexed transmission of the TV picture elements with D2-MAC.

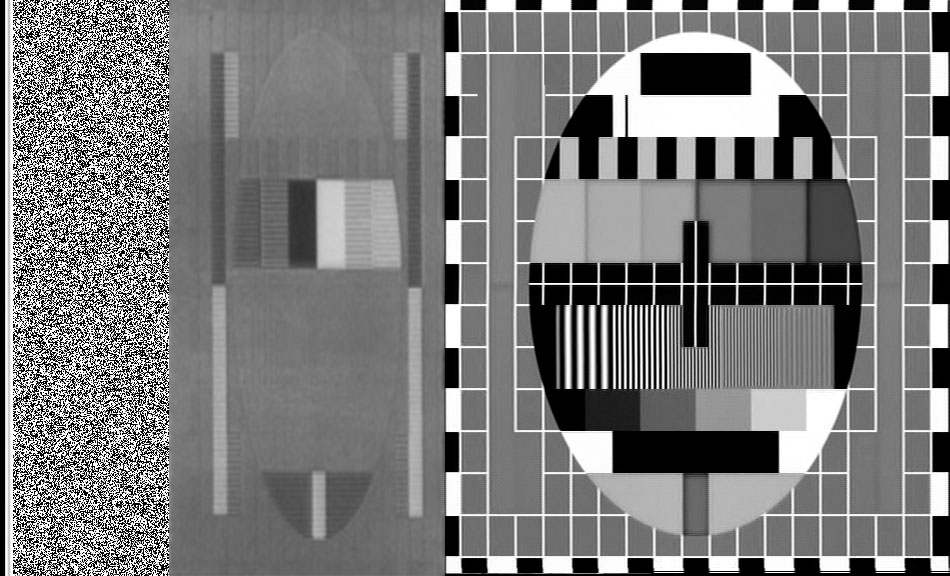
Simulated MAC signal. From left to right: digital data, chrominance and luminance

In television electronics, A-MAC is a form of analog video encoding, specifically a type of Multiplexed Analogue Components (MAC) encoding. It carries digital information: sound, and data-teletext on an FM subcarrier at 7 MHz. Since the vision bandwidth of a standard MAC signal is 8.4 MHz, the horizontal resolution on A-MAC has to be reduced to make room for the 7 MHz carrier. A-MAC has not been used in service.

== Technical details ==
MAC transmits luminance and chrominance data separately in time rather than separately in frequency (as other analog television formats do, such as composite video).

Audio and scrambling (selective access):

- Audio, in a format similar to NICAM was transmitted digitally rather than as an FM subcarrier.
- The MAC standard included a standard scrambling system, EuroCrypt, a precursor to the standard DVB-CSA encryption system.

== TV transmission systems ==
- Analog high-definition television systems
- PAL, what MAC technology tried to replace
- SECAM, what MAC technology tried to replace
- A-MAC
- B-MAC
- C-MAC
- D-MAC
- E-MAC
- S-MAC
- D2-MAC
- HD-MAC, an early high-definition television standard allowing for 2048x1152 resolution.
- DVB-S, MAC technology was replaced by this standard
- DVB-T, MAC technology was replaced by this standard
