= D-MAC =

Television broadcasting system

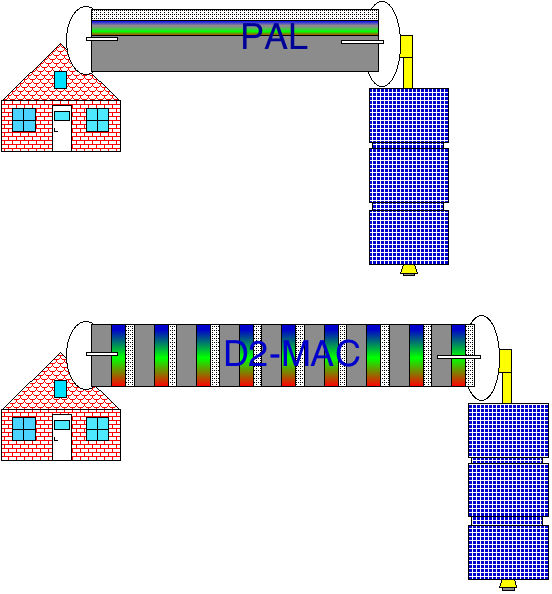
The simultaneous PAL transmission of all TV-picture elements and the multiplexed transmission of the TV picture elements with D2-MAC.

A preview of actual D2-MAC signal. From left to right: digital data, chrominance and luminance with teletext packets between fields.

Among the family of MAC or Multiplexed Analogue Components systems for television broadcasting, D-MAC is a reduced bandwidth variant designed for transmission down cable.

- The data is duobinary coded with a data burst rate of 20.25 Mbit/s so that 0° as well as ±90° phasors are used.
- D-MAC has a bandwidth of 8.4 MHz versus 27 MHz for C-MAC.
- Most cable systems work on EBU 7 MHz channel spacing, so this approach did not work universally.
- D-MAC's bandwidth problems were later fixed by D2-MAC.

== D2-MAC: a fix for D-MAC ==
D-MAC consumed too much bandwidth for many applications, so D2-MAC was designed for European cable TV systems.

== Luminance and chrominance ==
MAC transmits luminance and chrominance data separately in time rather than separately in frequency (as other analog television formats do, such as composite video).

== Audio and scrambling (selective access) ==
- Audio, in a format similar to NICAM was transmitted digitally rather than as an FM subcarrier.
- The MAC standard included a standard scrambling system, EuroCrypt, a precursor to the standard DVB-CSA encryption system.

== History and politics ==
MAC was developed by the UK's Independent Broadcasting Authority (IBA) and in 1982 was adopted as the transmission format for the UK's forthcoming direct broadcast satellite (DBS) television services (eventually provided by British Satellite Broadcasting). The following year MAC was adopted by the European Broadcasting Union (EBU) as the standard for all DBS.

By 1986, despite there being two standards, D-MAC and D2-MAC, favoured by different countries in Europe, an EU Directive imposed MAC on the national DBS broadcasters, to provide a stepping stone from analogue PAL and Secam formats to the eventual high definition and digital television of the future, with European TV manufacturers in a privileged position to provide the equipment required.

However, the Astra satellite system was also starting up at this time (the first satellite, Astra 1A was launched in 1989) and that operated outside of the EU's MAC requirements, due to being a non-DBS satellite. Despite further pressure from the EU (including a further Directive originally intended to make MAC provision compulsory in TV sets, and a subsidy to broadcasters to use the MAC format), most broadcasters outside Scandinavia preferred the lower cost of PAL transmission and receiving equipment.

In the 2000s, the use of D-MAC and D2-MAC ceased when the satellite broadcasts of the channels concern changed to DVB-S format.

== See also ==
- Analog high-definition television systems
- PAL and SECAM, analogous technologies that MAC was designed to replace
- A-MAC
- B-MAC
- C-MAC
- E-MAC
- S-MAC
- D2-MAC
- HD-MAC, an early high-definition television standard allowing for 2048x1152 resolution.
- DVB-S, MAC technology was replaced by this standard
- DVB-T, MAC technology was replaced by this standard
