= Multiplexed Analogue Components =

1980s analog television standard

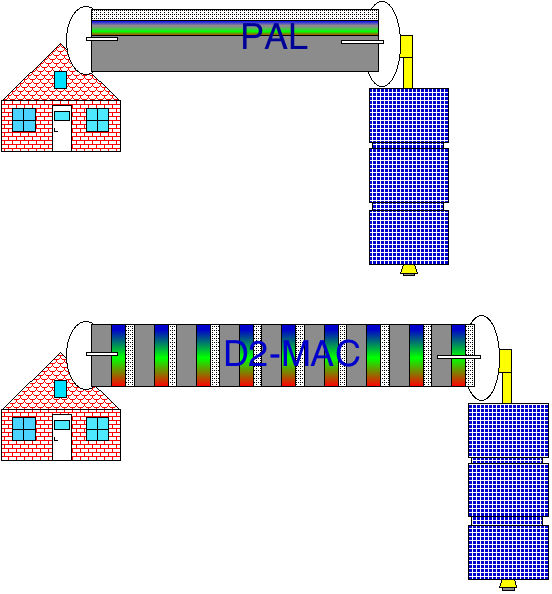
The simultaneous PAL transmission of all TV-picture elements and the multiplexed transmission of the TV picture elements with D2-MAC.

625-lines MAC signal. From left to right: digital data, chrominance and luminance. Both fields (odd and even lines) are shown.

Multiplexed Analogue Components (MAC) was an analog television standard where luminance and chrominance components were transmitted separately. This was an evolution from older color TV systems (such as PAL or SECAM) where there was interference between chrominance and luminance.

MAC was originally proposed in the 1980s for use on a Europe-wide terrestrial HDTV system. Terrestrial transmission tests were conducted in France, although the system was never used for that purpose. Various variants were developed, collectively known as the "MAC/packet" family.

In 1985 MAC was recommended for satellite and cable broadcasts by the European Broadcasting Union (EBU), with specific variants for each medium. C-MAC/packet was intended for Direct Broadcast Satellite (DBS), D-MAC/packet for wide-band cable, and D2-MAC/packet for both for DBS and narrow-band cable.

== History ==
MAC was originally developed by the Independent Broadcasting Authority in the early 1980, as a system for delivering high quality pictures via direct broadcast satellites, that would be independent of European countries' choice of terrestrial colour-coding standard.

In 1982, MAC was adopted as the transmission format for the UK's forthcoming DBS television services, eventually provided by British Satellite Broadcasting. The following year, MAC was adopted by the EBU as the standard for all DBS broadcasts.

By 1986, despite there being two variants (D-MAC and D2-MAC) favoured by different countries, an EU Directive imposed MAC on the national DBS broadcasters. The justification was to provide a stepping stone from analogue formats (PAL and SECAM) the future HD and digital television, placing European TV manufacturers in a privileged position to provide the equipment required.

However, the Astra satellite system was also starting up at this time (the first satellite, Astra 1A, was launched in 1989), operating outside of the EU's MAC requirements, due to being a non-DBS satellite.

Despite further pressure from the EU (including a Directive to make MAC compulsory in TV sets, and subsidies to broadcasters using MAC), most broadcasters outside of Scandinavia preferred the lower costs of PAL equipment, and the system had a limited adoption.

In the 2000s, the use of D-MAC and D2-MAC ceased when satellite broadcasts changed to DVB-S format.

== Broadcast Variants ==
A number of broadcast variants exist, according to the way the digital signals are multiplexed with the MAC vision signal.

- A-MAC was designed as a test-bed for the MAC concept. It was never used by any broadcaster, but eventually evolved into S-MAC.
- B-MAC was used in South Africa by Multichoice, Australia by Optus, the US by Primestar and American Forces Radio and Television Service. It was also used in parts of Asia until 2005, when it was replaced by digital compression.
- C-MAC required a bandwidth of about 22 MHz, making it problematic for broadcasting. It could carry eight high quality (15 kHz bandwidth) sound channels. It has a wide-screen backwardly compatible variant called E-MAC.
- D-MAC was a UK standard used by British Satellite Broadcasting for satellite broadcasts, needing a bandwidth of approximately 10.5 MHz. It could carry eight high quality (15 kHz bandwidth) sound channels It was used in Norway by NRK, transmitting 3 radio channels and 1 TV channel at one D-MAC channel.
- D2-MAC reduces the required bandwidth to 7.8 MHz, allowing the system to be used on cable and satellite broadcast. It could carry four high quality (15 kHz bandwidth) or eight lower quality audio channels. It was adopted by Scandinavian, German and French satellite broadcasts (CNBC Europe, TV3 (Sweden), TV3 (Denmark), EuroSport, NRK 1, TV-Sat 2, TDF 1, TDF 2, etc.). The system was used until July 2006 in Scandinavia and until the mid-1990s for German and French sound channels.
- HD-MAC was an early high-definition television standard, allowing for 2048x1152 resolution.

== Studio (non-broadcast) MAC variants ==
S-MAC or Studio MAC is a non-broadcast variant, used mostly in North America. The main advantages of this variant are:

- Processing NTSC component signals yields better results (a higher quality image) than manipulating NTSC directly – thus the need to create S-MAC.
- It is not possible to mix standard MAC signals in the studio environment because the R-Y and B-Y components are carried on alternate lines.
- S-MAC's SECAM like approach to bandwidth reduction is technical annoyance, but most studio users are not affected by it.
- In S-MAC the luminance is compressed by 2:1 and the two chrominance signals by 4:1 so that all three may occupy the same line.
- S-MAC's vision bandwidth is 11 MHz, only ~2.8x that of NTSC's vision bandwidth of 4.2 MHz.
- S-MAC can be carried on a single circuit and converted losslessly to and from C-MAC at any stage.
- S-MAC is well suited for SNG applications (AKA: news gathering trucks).

== Technical overview ==
MAC transmits luminance and chrominance data separately in time rather than separately in frequency (as other analog television formats do, such as composite video). This allows for full separation of the components. The signals are also time-compressed (with ratios of 3:2 for luminance and 3:1 for chrominance) and the two color difference signals are transmitted on alternate lines, further increasing compression. The color space was YPbPr, with a luminance component and red blue color difference chrominance components.

=== Audio and scrambling (selective access) ===
- Audio, in a format similar to NICAM was transmitted digitally rather than as an FM sub-carrier.
- The MAC standard included a standard scrambling system, EuroCrypt, a precursor to the standard DVB-CSA encryption system

=== Technical details ===
In MAC color is encoded using the YPbPr color space. Luma ($Y'$) is derived from red, green, and blue ($R', G', B'$) after gamma-correction (formula similar to PAL): $Y'= 0.2997R' + 0.587G' + 0.1145B'$

Chrominance is computed based on $B-Y$ and $R-Y$ differences, generating two compressed and weighted color-difference signals know in older MAC references as $E'{\scriptstyle\text{Um}}$ and $E'{\scriptstyle\text{Vm}}$ or $C{\scriptstyle\text{B}}$ and $C{\scriptstyle\text{R}}$. To avoid any confusion, and since the signals are analogue and bi-polar, these terms were replaced by $P{\scriptstyle\text{B}}$ and $P{\scriptstyle\text{R}}$. $P{\scriptstyle\text{B}}$ is transmitted on odd lines, while $P{\scriptstyle\text{R}}$ is transmitted on even lines.

The $Y'$ signal range is between -0.5 and 0.5 volts while $P{\scriptstyle\text{B}}$ and $P{\scriptstyle\text{R}}$ signals vary between -0.65 to 0.65 volts.

The following table lists the main technical parameters of the various MAC variants:

| | B-MAC | B-MAC | C-MAC | D-MAC | D2-MAC |
| Frame Frequency | 29.97 | 25 | | | |
| Lines per frame | 525 | 625 | | | |
| Aspect Ratio | 4:3 / 16:9 | | | | |
| Display Gamma | 2.2 | 2.8 | | | |
| Primary chromaticities (x y) | Similar to NTSC 1953: Red 0.67, 0.33; Green 0.21, 0.71; Blue 0.14, 0.08 | | | | |
| White point (x y) | D65 | | | | |
| Luminance | $Y'= 0.2997R' + 0.587G' + 0.1145B'$ | | | | |
| Colour difference | $I' = -0.27 (B' - Y') + 0.74 (R' - Y')$ $Q' = -0.41 (B' - Y') + 0.48 (R' - Y')$ | $R' - Y' = 0.701R'-0.587G'-0.114B'$ $B' - Y' =-0.299R'-0.587G'-0.886B'$ | | | |
| Transmitted chrominance | $P'{\scriptstyle\text{B}} = 0.694 (B'-Y')$ $P'{\scriptstyle\text{R}} = 0.926 (R'- Y')$ | | $P'{\scriptstyle\text{B}} = 0.733(B'-Y')$ $P'{\scriptstyle\text{R}} = 0.927(R'-Y')$ | | |
| Sampling frequency (MHz) | 14.318 | 14.219 | 13.500 | | |
| Uncompressed bandwidth (MHz) | 4.2 | 5.0 | 5.6 | | |
| Luminance clock periods | 750 | | 696 | | |
| Chrominance clock periods | 375 | | 348 | | |

== MAC system innovations ==
Mathematical:

- A-MAC proved the mathematical principle that separating vision from colour for TV transmission was technologically viable.

Broadcast engineering:

- The MAC audio subsystem is very similar to NICAM, so much so that identical chip-sets are used.
- D-MAC satellite broadcasts provided the first broadcast sourced wide-screen television in Europe, and HD-MAC provided the first HDTV broadcasts, in 1992.

== Technical challenges ==
Although the MAC technique is capable of superior video quality, (similar to the improvement of component video over composite in a DVD player), its major drawback was that this quality was only ever realized when the video signals being transmitted remained in component form from source to transmitter. If at any stage the video had to be handled in composite form, the necessary encoding/decoding processes would severely degrade the picture quality.

- Terrestrial TV broadcasters were never able to take full advantage of MAC image quality due to multiple interactions between their composite and component signal paths.
- Direct to Home and TVRO broadcasters were able to take advantage of MAC's improved image quality because their studios and routing facilities were far less complex.
- The success of NICAM audio for terrestrial television can be traced to the success of MAC technology. The MAC audio subsystem is nearly identical in design and function to NICAM.

== Countries and territories that used MAC ==
This is a list of nations that used the MAC standard for television broadcasting:

- South Africa
- Australia
- UK
- Norway
- Germany
- France
- USA

== Technological obsolescence ==
Since the vast majority of TV stations and similar installations were only wired for composite video, the fitting of a MAC transmitter at the end of the chain had the effect of degrading the transmitted image quality, rather than improving it.

For this and other technical reasons, MAC systems never really caught on with broadcasters. MAC transmission technology was made obsolete by the radically new digital systems (like DVB-T and ATSC) in the late 1990s.

== See also ==
TV transmission systems:

- Analog high-definition television systems
- PAL, what MAC technology tried to replace
- SECAM, what MAC technology tried to replace
- DVB-S, MAC technology was replaced by this standard
- DVB-T, MAC technology was replaced by this standard
