= CMAC (disambiguation) =

CMAC is the Cipher-based Message Authentication Code, a cryptographic algorithm.

CMAC may also refer to:

== Science and technology ==
- Cerebellar model articulation controller, type of neural network
- Continuous monitoring and adaptive control (stormwater management), a type of stormwater BMP

== Organizations ==
- Cambodian Mine Action Centre, see Land mines in Cambodia
- Center for Maritime Archaeology and Conservation (CMAC), at Texas A&M University, US
- Court Martial Appeal Court of Canada

== Other uses ==
- Constellation Brands – Marvin Sands Performing Arts Center, an outdoor concert venue in Canadaigua, New York, US

== See also ==
- C-MAC, a European television standard
