= D2-MAC =

Satellite television transmission standard

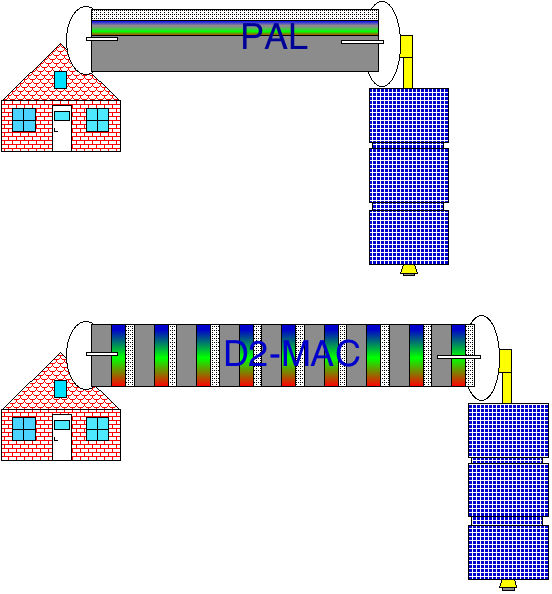
The simultaneous PAL transmission of all TV-picture elements and the multiplexed transmission of the TV picture elements with D2-MAC.

A preview of actual D2-MAC signal. From left to right: digital data, chrominance and luminance with teletext packets between fields.

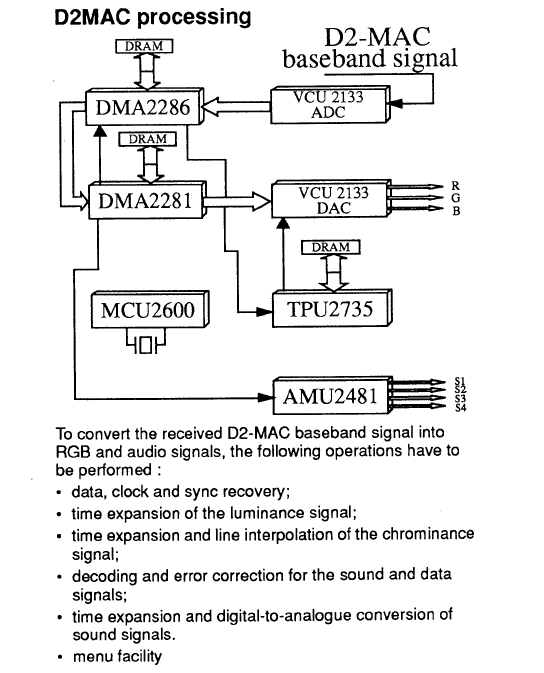
D2-Mac processing on a Philips satellite receiver from 1990

D2-MAC is a satellite television transmission standard, a member of Multiplexed Analogue Components family. It was created to solve D-MAC's bandwidth usage by further reducing it, allowing usage of the system on cable and satellite broadcast. It could carry four high quality (15 kHz bandwidth) sound channels or eight lower quality audio channels. It was adopted by Scandinavian, German and French satellite broadcasts (CNBC Europe, TV3 (Sweden), TV3 (Denmark), EuroSport, NRK 1, TV-Sat 2, TDF 1, TDF 2, etc.). The system was used until July 2006 in Scandinavia and until the mid-1990s for German and French sound channels.

== Technical details ==
MAC transmits luminance and chrominance data separately in time rather than separately in frequency (as other analog television formats do, such as composite video).

- Audio, in a format similar to NICAM was transmitted digitally rather than as an FM sub-carrier.
- The MAC standard included a standard scrambling system, EuroCrypt, a precursor to the standard DVB-CSA encryption system.
- D2-MAC uses half the data rate of D-MAC (10.125 Mbit/s)
- D2-MAC has a reduced vision bandwidth, about 1/2 that of D-MAC.
- D2-MAC retains most of the quality of a D-MAC signal—but consumes only 5 MHz of bandwidth.

== History and politics ==
MAC was developed by the UK's Independent Broadcasting Authority (IBA) and in 1982 was adopted as the transmission format for the UK's forthcoming direct broadcast satellite (DBS) television services (eventually provided by British Satellite Broadcasting). The following year MAC was adopted by the European Broadcasting Union (EBU) as the standard for all DBS.

By 1986, despite there being two standards, D-MAC and D2-MAC, favoured by different countries in Europe, an EU Directive imposed MAC on the national DBS broadcasters, to provide a stepping stone from analogue PAL and SECAM formats to the eventual high definition and digital television of the future, with European TV manufacturers in a privileged position to provide the equipment required.

However, the Astra satellite system was also starting up at this time (the first satellite, Astra 1A was launched in 1989) and that operated outside of the EU's MAC requirements, due to being a non-DBS satellite. Despite further pressure from the EU (including a further Directive originally intended to make MAC provision compulsory in TV sets, and a subsidy to broadcasters to use the MAC format), most broadcasters outside Scandinavia preferred the lower cost of PAL transmission and receiving equipment.

In the 2000s, the use of D-MAC and D2-MAC ceased when the satellite broadcasts of the channels concerned changed to DVB-S format.

== See also ==
- Analog high-definition television systems
- PAL & SECAM
- Multiplexed Analogue Components
- DVB-S & DVB-T
