= Arte France =

French audiovisual company

- Logo of Arte
- Formerly: La Sept; La Sept-Arte
- Type: Société anonyme
- Industry: Television, radio, publishing, cinema
- Founded: February 1986
- Headquarters: Issy-les-Moulineaux, France
- Owners: France Télévisions (45%); French state (25%); Radio France (15%); INA (15%)
- Number of employees: 200

Arte France is a French audiovisual company that is part of the European culture channel Arte. It was created in February 1986 under the name La Sept to develop cultural and educational programming. It launched its television channel in 1989. It became the French arm of Arte upon the latter's creation in 1991. It ceased broadcasting as La Sept upon Arte's first broadcasts in 1992. It took the name La Sept-Arte in 1993, then its current name in 2000.

The company is owned by France Télévisions (45%), the French state (25%), Radio France (15%) and INA (15%). It is also involved in film through Arte France Cinéma, in radio through Arte Radio, in publishing (books and multimedia), in education (Arte Éducation), and more via Arte France Développement. It has also participated in the financing of French and international television channels including TV5Monde.

== History ==
=== La Sept (1986–1992) ===
Logo of La Sept from 1989 to 1992.

As early as 1984, French president François Mitterrand conceived the idea of a cultural and educational channel with a European focus. In 1985, Georges Fillioud, French Minister of Transport, charged Pierre Desgraupes with creating programmes for one or more of the five channels of the high-power satellite TDF 1 launched in 1988. In February 1986, La Société d'édition de programmes de télévision was created by Bernard Faivre d'Arcier, cultural adviser to the former Prime Minister Laurent Fabius, and began to develop a stock of cultural and educational programming. It was 45% owned by FR3, 25% by the French state, 15% by Radio France, and 15% by the INA. In French, the word "sept" means the number seven; and it not only represents the seventh network to have signed on in France, but it also serves as a backronym, for the Société d'édition de programmes de télévision (Television Programme Production Corporation). In March 1989, the full name of La Sept changed, becoming La Société européenne de programmes de télévision (European Television Programme Corporation). The acronym, however, remained unchanged.

La Sept's statutes stipulated that it should only produce programmes of a European nature and prepare for the launch of a satellite channel. However, La Sept was perceived primarily as being a French-centric company in the first months of its operations, with members of the press expressing skepticism regarding its European outreach. As of August 1986, La Sept's participation with the European Economic Community was limited to a private production company based in London. In autumn of 1986, a new team chaired by historian George Duby was brought in and affirmed its commitment to the deeply European nature of the project. In November, La Sept's programming committee was established and included members representing four public broadcasters from neighboring European countries. La Sept began seeking partners to establish a network for the production and exchange of programs in Europe. La Sept signed its first cooperation agreement with West Germany's ZDF on March 23, 1987, in Mainz, to last for a three-year period. Between 1987 and 1988, similar agreements were signed with ARD (also of West Germany), Belgium's RTBF; Switzerland's SSR, Denmark's Danmarks Radio, Sweden's SVT, Channel Four (UK), Austria's ORF, Spain's RTVE, and Greece's ERT. In 1987, FR3 hosted La Sept's programming on its airwaves from noon to midnight on three separate days (May 8, June 8, and July 26), with each day centered around a theme.

In April 1989, the Conseil supérieur de l'audiovisuel granted permission to broadcast on one of TDF 1's channels, and La Sept began transmission on 14 May 1989. The station broadcast three hours and 30 minutes of programmes per day, with each programme broadcast twice. In June, an agreement was reached to broadcast La Sept's programmes on cable television, and on 3 February 1990, FR3 gave the La Sept a window on their terrestrial broadcast channel every Saturday from 15:00 to midnight.

In 1989, Michael Nyman released a promotional album, La Sept, containing music recorded for the network.

On 2 October 1990, the eve of German reunification, France's Minister of Culture and the Minister-Presidents of the eleven Länder of the former West Germany signed an intergovernmental treaty in Berlin establishing the foundations of a joint television company with a cultural and European focus. On 30 April 1991, Arte (Association relative à la télévision européenne) was created as a European economic interest grouping (EEIG) equally divided between two entities: La Sept in France and Arte Deutschland TV in Germany, with the latter being owned 50-50 by the German public broadcasters ARD and ZDF. On 30 May 1992, Arte's first broadcasts aired simultaneously in France and Germany via satellite and cable. On this occasion, La Sept ceased to exist as a channel. On 27 September 1993, it changed its name to Sept-Arte and became Arte France on 1 August 2000.

=== Cinema ===
Between 1986 and 1991, La Sept was involved in the co-production and support of several feature films, being variously credited as La S.E.P.T., La SEPT or La Sept. On 4 September 1991, La Sept established a dedicated film production company known as La Sept Cinéma. It was officially renamed Arte France Cinéma on 16 July 1998. Arte France Cinéma is a subsidiary of Arte France that supports the production of approximately 20 films and three feature-length documentaries every year, including one animated feature film. Since its inception, it has supported the production of more than 600 films.
