= Dacast =

Streaming video platform

Dacast, Inc.
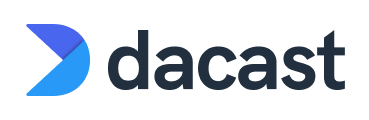
- Industry: Software, Media
- Founded: 2008; 18 years ago
- Headquarters: San Francisco, California, U.S.
- Area served: Worldwide
- Services: OTT, live streaming, video Hosting
- Number of employees: 30 (2025)
- Website: www.dacast.com

Dacast, Inc. (formerly known as Andolis) is an American live streaming and hosting online video platform that allows businesses to broadcast and host live and on-demand video content as well as offer free or paid programming.

Unlike consumer oriented platforms such as YouTube or Facebook Live, Dacast is business-to-business (B2B). As of early 2025, over 400,000 video producers have used Dacast, including TV and radio stations, event production companies, sports organizations, public organizations such as US government, school and university networks, as well as church and house of worship networks.

Dacast is headquartered in San Francisco with additional locations in Nantes, Beijing, and Manila.

The platform was launched globally on October 26, 2010. Dacast users are located worldwide, including China as 北京维迪奥科技有限公司 (Beijing Video Technology Limited).

== History ==
The company was founded in 2008 by Stephane Roulland and Aldric Feuillebois. Initially the service was based on the multicast peer-to-peer (P2P) technology, with Dacast being the product name, proprietary of Andolis LLC.

This approach was abandoned because of a significant decrease in the cost of data, removing the competitive advantage of P2P.

In preparation for its official launch in 2010, Andolis renamed itself as Dacast.

Since 2013, Streaming Media Magazine has included Dacast among the lists of the 100 companies and 50 companies that matter most in online video. In 2018 and in 2019, Dacast received the Streaming Media Readers' Choice Award for "Small/Medium-Sized Business Video Platform".

In March 2019, Dacast acquired vzaar, a UK based online video platform.

== Services ==
Dacast is a self-service live video streaming solution and features an OVP video platform, video hosting, and a VOD (video on demand) platform. Its white-label system allows users to control their live streams and VODs. The company provides encoding and live transcoding as part of its services. Dacast positions itself as a cloud-based SaaS solution (software as a service) with the following slogan: "Streaming as a Service".

Dacast offers an Over-the-Top (OTT) Solution that allows businesses to broadcast live or on-demand content through their own apps, accessible across all devices, eliminating the need for traditional video broadcasting methods like satellite and cable.

The platform allows users to monetize their video content via an integrated paywall into the media player or via ads integration.

The app also offers various features to enhance your experience, such as social media streaming, folder management, playlists and an all-in-one website to showcase users' content.

== Technology ==
Dacast currently provides video and audio content distribution based on industry standard HTML5 technology. The stream ingest is RTMP and the stream delivery is supported in HLS and HDS formats. The platform also provides direct HLS ingest.

The platform is compatible with different video file formats such as .MOV, .MP4, .MP3, .M4A or AAC and can transcode other formats to make them compatible with the service. The H.264 and X264 video compression standards allowing streaming in high-definition video (HD) are supported.

== Viewing ==
Videos and live streams hosted on the Dacast platform can be embedded and viewed on the broadcasters’ websites, as well as on Facebook, YouTube, Twitch, and other social media platforms.

Dacast is available on Microsoft Windows, Mac OS & iOS, and Android. The platform can be used for both live and on-demand content.

== Partnerships ==
Decast partners with CDNs such as Akamai Technologies, Amazon Web Services, OBS Studio, and more.
