= Continuous monitoring and adaptive control (stormwater management) =

Stormwater management practice

Continuous monitoring and adaptive control (CMAC) is a category of stormwater best management practice that allows for a wider range of operation of detention and retention ponds. CMAC systems typically consist of a water level sensor, an actuated valve, and an internet connection.

Specific applications of CMAC include flood protection, water quality treatment, water reuse, and channel protection.

== See also ==
- Urban runoff
