= C band =

C band may refer to:

- C band (IEEE), a radio frequency band from 4 to 8 GHz
- C band (infrared), an infrared band from 1530 to 1565 nm (roughly 200 THz)
- C band (NATO), a radio frequency band from 500 MHz to 1 GHz
- C-banding, in genetics
