= Subcarrier multiplexing =

Subcarrier Multiplexing (SCM) is a method for combining (multiplexing) many different communications signals so that they can be transmitted along a single optical fiber. SCM (also known as SCMA, SubCarrier Multiple Access) is used in passive optical network (PON) access infrastructures as a variant of wavelength division multiplexing (WDM).

SCM follows a different approach compared to WDM. In WDM an optical carrier is modulated with a baseband signal of typically hundred of Mbit/s. In an SCMA infrastructure, the baseband data is first modulated on a GHz wide subcarrier, that is subsequently modulated on the optical carrier. This way each signal occupies a different portion of the optical spectrum surrounding the centre frequency of the optical carrier. At the receiving side, as normally happens in a commercial radio service, the receiver is tuned to the correct subcarrier frequency, filtering out the other subcarriers.

The operation of multiplexing and demultiplexing the single subcarriers is carried out electronically. The conversion into the optical carrier is done at the multiplexer side. This gives an advantage over a pure WDM access, due to the lower cost of the electrical components if compared with an optical multiplexer.

SCM has the disadvantage of being limited in maximum subcarrier frequencies and data rates by the available bandwidth of the electrical and optical components. Therefore, SCM must be used in conjunction with WDM in order to take advantage of most of the available fiber bandwidth, but it can be used effectively for lower-speed, lower-cost multiuser systems.
