= TV-Sat 2 =

West German communications satellite

TV-SAT 2
- Names: TVSAT-2
- Mission type: Communications
- Operator: Deutsche Bundespost
- COSPAR ID: 1989-062A
- SATCAT no.: 20168
- Website: https://www.telekom.com/en
- Mission duration: 8 years (planned); 10 years (achieved)

Spacecraft properties
- Spacecraft: TV-Sat 2
- Spacecraft type: Spacebus
- Bus: Spacebus 300
- Manufacturer: Eurosatellite (Aérospatiale) and Messerschmitt-Bölkow-Blohm (MBB)
- Launch mass: 2,144 kg (4,727 lb)
- Dimensions: 2.4 x 1.64 x 6.4 m
- Power: 4.5 kW

Start of mission
- Launch date: 8 August 1989, 23:25:53 UTC
- Rocket: Ariane 44LP H10 (V33)
- Launch site: Centre Spatial Guyanais, Kourou, ELA-2
- Contractor: Arianespace
- Entered service: October 1998

End of mission
- Disposal: Graveyard orbit
- Deactivated: September 1999

Orbital parameters
- Reference system: Geocentric orbit
- Regime: Geostationary orbit
- Longitude: 19.2° West (1989-1995); 0.6 West (1995-1998); 12.5 West (1998-1999)

Transponders
- Band: 5 Ku-Band
- Bandwidth: 27 MHz
- Coverage area: Europe, Germany

TV-SAT 2 or TVSAT-2 was a West German communications satellite which was to have been operated by Deutsche Bundespost. It was intended to be used to provide television broadcast services to Europe. It was constructed by Aérospatiale, based on the Spacebus 300 satellite bus, and carried five Ku-band transponders. At launch it had a mass of 2,144 kg (4,727 lb), and an expected operational lifespan of eight years.

== Launch ==
TV-SAT 2 was launched with the Hipparcos scientific satellite by Arianespace using an Ariane 44LP H10 launch vehicle flying from ELA-2 at Centre Spatial Guyanais, Kourou, French Guiana. The launch took place at 23:25:53 UTC on 8 August 1989. It was a Spacebus 300 satellite bus.

== Mission ==
TV-SAT 2 was placed into a geostationary orbit at a longitude of 19.2° West. It was available on 25 August 1989 to broadcast the Berlin's TV show. It was leased to TeleTV AS and co-located with Intelsat 702 in 1995. In November 1998, TV-Sat 2 was leased to Eutelsat and moved to 12.5° West.

== See also ==
- 1989 in spaceflight
