= Electronovision =

Movie production process

Electronovision was a process used by producer and entrepreneur H. William "Bill" Sargent Jr. to produce a handful of motion pictures, theatrical plays, and specials in the 1960s and early 1970s using a high-resolution videotape process for production, later transferred to film via kinescope for theatrical release.

== Releases ==
More than half a dozen films were produced in this fashion, including the production of Richard Burton in Hamlet (1964), the concert film The T.A.M.I. Show (1964), and the Magna Film production of Harlow (1965), starring actress Carol Lynley as Jean Harlow.

== Process background ==
Electronovision was an entirely separate and more advanced process from the earlier Electronicam, used by the DuMont Television Network in the 1950s to telecast live TV shows with electronic cameras, while simultaneously filming the production with a film camera attached to the side of the video camera. That process had been used on TV series broadcast by DuMont as well as the "Classic 39" half-hour version of The Honeymooners that aired on CBS in the 1955–56 television season, allowing the producers to archive a high-quality film negative for reruns.

While the press releases on Electronovision were deliberately vague, perhaps to add more mystique to the process, it used conventional analog Image Orthicon video camera tube units, shooting in the B&W 819-line interlaced 25fps French video standard. This standard was used as Ampex high-band quadruplex video tape recorders (VTR) were able to record it when equipped with proper version of Intersync module.

The promoters of Electronovision gave the impression that this was a new system created from scratch, using a high-tech name (and avoiding the word kinescope) to distinguish the process from conventional film photography. Nonetheless, the advances in tape-to-reel time were, at the time, a major step ahead. By capturing more than 800 lines of resolution at 25 frame/s, raw tape could be converted to film via kinescope recording with sufficient enhanced resolution to allow big-screen enlargement. The 1960s productions used RCA TK-60 image orthicon video cameras, which have a characteristic white "glow" around black objects (and a corresponding black glow around white objects), which was an inherent flaw of image orthicon video camera tubes called "blooming." Later vidicon and plumbicon tubes produced much cleaner, more accurate pictures, as well as a higher resolution of 1400 lines.

Electronovision as used to capture a live stage performance and then record to film for theatrical release.

Videotape editing of the period was very primitive, which forced Electronovision producers to approach their productions essentially as if they were live TV broadcasts. Whole scenes were shot in long blocks, typically at least 5 or 10 minutes, and segments were physically cut together using mechanical 2" videotape splicing blocks. A special chemical solution and magnetic powder, applied to the videotape and viewed under a microscope, allowed the editor to see the video pulses and precisely align them for glitch-free editing. However, the technique was hit-and-miss and made it difficult to make accurate, fast edits.

Sargent's original Electronovision empire went out of business around 1966, following the release of Stop the World – I Want to Get Off. The producer revived the idea in 1975 with newer, color video equipment, and was able to mount a critically acclaimed independent release of James Whitmore's one-man show Give 'em Hell, Harry!, a biographical play based on the life of U.S. President Harry S. Truman. Two years later, Sargent had his most successful production, Richard Pryor's early 1979 live stand-up comedy performance Richard Pryor: Live in Concert, which received wide distribution in theaters as well as on cable TV and, later, home video.

== Decline ==
Health and business problems forced Sargent to retire in the 1980s. The process became a footnote in history, though several other attempts were made to revive the essential concept—a higher-resolution videotape system, using modified video cameras, recording to videotape and then making a kinescope for theatrical release.

== Rival processes ==
Avant-garde musician Frank Zappa co-directed and co-wrote 200 Motels (1971), which was shot on PAL color videotape at Pinewood Studios in England. The production featured dazzling graphics, video feedback, and chromakey visual effects, and is considered a precursor to the music videos of the 1980s. The production was electronically edited using early Ampex equipment, then transferred to 35mm film for theatrical release.

The Vidtronics Company, a division of Technicolor, had developed a process for transferring color videotape to film, and to demonstrate its potential produced The Resurrection of Zachary Wheeler (1971), a combination science-fiction and political conspiracy thriller, starring Leslie Nielsen and Angie Dickinson. The picture was shot by the Madison Productions crew from the TV series Death Valley Days, transferred and processed by Technicolor, and distributed by a Technicolor subsidiary, Gold Key Entertainment. It was not successful in theatres, but was frequently shown in TV syndication and 16mm rentals.

In 1973, Hollywood actor/producer Ed Platt, made famous by his role as "The Chief" in the NBC-TV series Get Smart, raised the money to produce Santee, starring Glenn Ford. Platt saw the advantages of using videotape over film, and used the facilities of Burbank's Compact Video Systems to shoot the western on location in the California and Nevada deserts. The motion picture was shot with Norelco PCP-70 portable plumbicon NTSC cameras and portable Ampex VR-3000 2" VTRs, then transferred to film at Consolidated Film Industries in Hollywood. The film was not commercially successful. Platt committed suicide about six months after the film was released.

In 1976, TV producer George Schlatter, known for his successful NBC-TV series Laugh-In and many TV comedy specials, wrote and directed the motion picture Norman... Is That You?, based on the controversial Broadway play. Also recorded on NTSC videotape, the film starred comedian Redd Foxx and Pearl Bailey. The film enjoyed some critical success, but was Schlatter's only foray into feature films.

Los Angeles video post-production company Image Transform specialized in creating very high-quality recordings using 3M EBR film recorders that could perform color film-out recording on 16mm by exposing three 16mm frames in a row (one red, one green and one blue) during the 1970s and 1980s. The company's Image Vision process used modified 24fps 10 MHz Bosch Fernseh KCK-40 cameras and similarly modified 24 fps VTRs as part of a custom pre-HDTV video system. The 1 inch type B videotape VTRs would record and play back 24fps video at 10 MHz bandwidth, at about twice the normal NTSC resolution. The Image Vision process was used on several minor shorts and theatrical releases, including Monty Python Live at the Hollywood Bowl (1982). Image Vision was superseded by the analog NHK Hi-Vision high definition system of the early 1990s.

== See also ==
- 819-line French TV system
- Display resolution
- Kinescope
- Quadruplex videotape
- Videotape
- Video tape recorder
