= TDF 2 =

French communications satellite

- Names: TDF-2
- Mission type: Communications
- Operator: Télévision de France / France Telecom
- COSPAR ID: 1990-063A
- SATCAT no.: 20705
- Mission duration: 8 years (planned); 9 years (achieved)

Spacecraft properties
- Spacecraft: TDF 2
- Spacecraft type: Spacebus
- Bus: Spacebus 300
- Manufacturer: Eurosatellite (Aérospatiale) and Messerschmitt-Bölkow-Blohm (MBB)
- Launch mass: 2,144 kg (4,727 lb)
- Dry mass: 1,300 kg (2,900 lb)
- Dimensions: 2.4 x 1.64 x 7.1 m Span: 19.3 m on orbit
- Power: 4.3 kW

Start of mission
- Launch date: 24 July 1990, 22:25:00 UTC
- Rocket: Ariane 44L H10 (V37)
- Launch site: Centre Spatial Guyanais, Kourou, ELA-2
- Contractor: Arianespace
- Entered service: September 1990

End of mission
- Disposal: Graveyard orbit
- Deactivated: May 1999

Orbital parameters
- Reference system: Geocentric orbit
- Regime: Geostationary orbit
- Longitude: 19.2° West (1990-1997); 36° East (1997-1999)

Transponders
- Band: 5 Ku-Band
- Bandwidth: 27 MHz
- Coverage area: Europe, France

TDF 2 or TDF-2 was a French communications satellite which was to have been operated by Télévision de France (France Télécom). It was intended to be used to provide television broadcast services to Europe, however it failed before entering service. It was constructed by Aérospatiale, based on the Spacebus 300 satellite bus, and carried five Ku-band transponders. At launch it had a mass of 2,144 kg (4,727 lb), and an expected operational lifespan of eight years.

== Launch ==
TDF 2 was launched by Arianespace using an Ariane 44L H10 launch vehicle flying from ELA-2 at Centre Spatial Guyanais, Kourou, French Guiana. The launch took place at 22:25:00 UTC on 24 July 1990. It was a Spacebus 300 satellite bus.

== Mission ==
TDF 2 was placed into a geostationary orbit at a longitude of 19.2° West. In August 1997, at 36° East, the bird joined the Eutelsat fleet. TDF 2 is expected to remain in service at least until early 1999.

== See also ==
- 1990 in spaceflight
