= C-MAC =

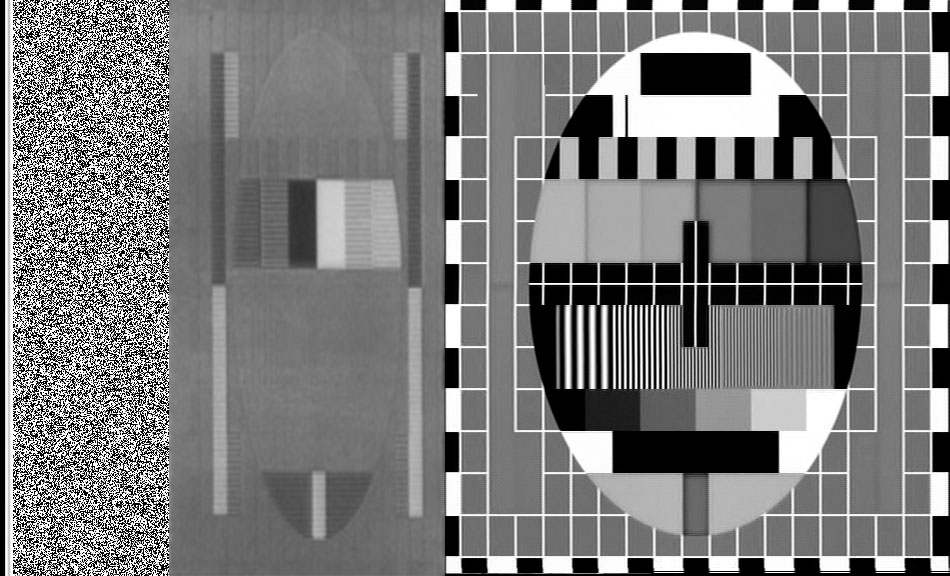
Simulated MAC signal. From left to right: digital data, chrominance and luminance

C-MAC/packet is a variant of the family of MAC (Multiplexed Analogue Components) systems for television broadcasting, developed by IBA and approved by the European Broadcasting Union (EBU) for satellite TV transmissions.

It was an analog television standard where luminance and chrominance components are transmitted separately in time rather than separately in frequency. This was an evolution from older color TV systems (such as PAL or SECAM) where there was interference between chrominance and luminance.

== Technical details ==
C-MAC required a bandwidth of about 22 MHz, making it unsuitable for direct-to-home or cable broadcast.

The transmitter switches between FM (vision) and PSK (sound/data) modulation during each television line period. The digital information is modulated using 2-4PSK (phase-shift keying), a variation of quadrature PSK where only two of the phaser angles (±90°) are used, with a data rate of 20.25 Mbit/s. This allows for the transmission of up to eight high quality (15 kHz bandwidth) sound channels.

C-MAC data was sent to the transmitter separately from the vision. The C-MAC standard included a standard scrambling system, EuroCrypt, a precursor to the standard DVB-CSA encryption system.

== E-MAC ==
E-MAC (Extended MAC) is 16:9 version of C-MAC. Originally E-MAC was designed for 15:9 pictures, it later adopted the 16:9 aspect ratio.

- In E-MAC all the 4:3 information is transmitted exactly as in C-MAC so that C-MAC receivers are still compatible.
- E-MAC hides extra luminance and chrominance information in the field blanking interval and parts of the line blanking interval.
- E-MAC has a lower data capacity because luminance is hidden where data would usually be located.
- A 'steering' signal is transmitted to indicate to the 16:9 receiver whereabouts the 4:3 picture information.
- E-MAC receivers stitch the 4:3 and helper widescreen data into a seamless 16:9 picture.

== See also ==
TV transmission systems

- Analog high-definition television systems
- DVB-S
- DVB-T
- Multiplexed Analogue Components
- PAL
- SECAM
