= TDF 1 =

French communications satellite

- Names: TDF-1
- Mission type: Communications
- Operator: Télévision de France / France Télécom
- COSPAR ID: 1988-098A
- SATCAT no.: 19621
- Mission duration: 8 years (planned); 8 years (achieved)

Spacecraft properties
- Spacecraft: TDF 1
- Spacecraft type: Spacebus
- Bus: Spacebus 300
- Manufacturer: Eurosatellite (Aérospatiale) and Messerschmitt-Bölkow-Blohm (MBB)
- Launch mass: 2,144 kg (4,727 lb)
- Dry mass: 1,300 kg (2,900 lb)
- Dimensions: 2.4 x 1.64 x 7.1 m Span: 19.3 m on orbit
- Power: 4.3 kW

Start of mission
- Launch date: 28 October 1988, 02:17:00 UTC
- Rocket: Ariane 2 (V26)
- Launch site: Centre Spatial Guyanais, Kourou, ELA-1
- Contractor: Arianespace
- Entered service: December 1988

End of mission
- Disposal: Graveyard orbit
- Deactivated: October 1996

Orbital parameters
- Reference system: Geocentric orbit
- Regime: Geostationary orbit
- Longitude: 19.2° West (1988-1996)

Transponders
- Band: 5 Ku-Band
- Bandwidth: 27 MHz
- Coverage area: Europe, France

TDF 1 or TDF-1 was a French communications satellite which was to have been operated by Télévision de France (France Télécom). It was intended to be used to provide television broadcast services to Europe, however it failed before entering service. It was constructed by Aérospatiale, based on the Spacebus 300 satellite bus, and carried five Ku-band transponders. At launch it had a mass of 2,144 kg (4,727 lb), and an expected operational lifespan of eight years.

== Launch ==
TDF 1 was launched by Arianespace using an Ariane 2 launch vehicle flying from ELA-1 at Centre Spatial Guyanais, Kourou, French Guiana. The launch took place at 02:17:00 UTC on 28 October 1988. It was a Spacebus 300 satellite bus.

== Mission ==
TDF 1 was placed into a geostationary orbit at a longitude of 19.2° West.

== See also ==
- 1988 in spaceflight
