= EuroCrypt =

EuroCrypt is a conditional access system for Multiplexed Analogue Components-encoded analogue satellite television. It had several versions (M, S and S2). It supported receivers with card slots and those with embedded keys. Its most widespread use was in Scandinavia, where the only EuroCrypt protected broadcasts remained until July 2006 (in France, they stopped in 1998).

It was also hacked with pirate cards, which was popular in many countries in Europe, especially in order to watch English-language channels such as Filmnet Plus and TV1000. EuroCrypt evolved into the Viaccess system for digital television.

== Sources ==
- Frequency List, dated 1998.
- Denmark's Radio receiver info
