= Analog high-definition television =

Analog video broadcast television system

Analog high-definition television has referred to a variety of analog video broadcast television systems with various display resolutions throughout history.

== Before 1940 ==
On 2 November 1936 the BBC began transmitting the world's first public regular analog "high definition" television service from the Victorian Alexandra Palace in north London. It therefore claims to be the birthplace of television broadcasting as we know it today. The UK's 405-line system introduced in 1936 was described as "high definition"; however, this was in comparison with the early 30-line (largely) experimental system from the 1920s, and would not be considered high definition by modern standards.

John Logie Baird, Philo T. Farnsworth, and Vladimir Zworykin had each developed competing TV systems, but resolution was not the issue that separated their substantially different technologies, it was patent interference lawsuits and deployment issues given the tumultuous financial climate of the late 1920s and 1930s. Most patents were expiring by the end of World War II leaving no worldwide standard for television. The standards introduced in the early 1950s stayed for over half a century.

== French 819-line system ==
819-line was a monochrome TV system developed and used in France as television broadcast resumed after World War II. Transmissions started in 1949 and were active up to 1985, although limited to France, Belgium and Luxembourg. It is associated with CCIR System E and F.

Despite some attempts to create a color SECAM version of the 819-line system, France gradually abandoned the system in favor of the Europe-wide standard of 625-lines with the final 819-line transmissions taking place in Paris from the Eiffel Tower on 19 July 1983. Tele Monte Carlo in Monaco were the last broadcasters to transmit 819-line television, closing down their transmitter in 1985.

== Multiple sub-nyquist sampling Encoding system (MUSE) ==
Japan had the earliest working HDTV system, with design efforts going back to 1979. The country began broadcasting wideband analog high-definition video signals in the late 1980s using an interlaced resolution of 1035 or 1080-lines active (1035i) and 1125-lines total supported by the Sony HDVS line of equipment.

The Japanese system, developed by NHK Science & Technology Research Laboratories in the 1980s, employed filtering tricks to reduce the original source signal to decrease bandwidth utilization. MUSE was marketed as "Hi-Vision" by NHK. Japanese broadcast engineers rejected conventional vestigial sideband broadcasting to allow transmitting a HD signal on a tighter bandwidth. It was decided early on that MUSE would be a satellite broadcast format as Japan economically supports satellite broadcasting.

In the typical setup, three picture elements on a line were actually derived from three separate scans. Stationary images were transmitted at full resolution. However, as MUSE lowers the horizontal and vertical resolution of material that varies greatly from frame to frame, moving images were blurred in a manner similar to using 16 mm movie film for HDTV projection. In fact, whole-camera pans would result in a loss of 50% of horizontal resolution. Shadows and multipath still plague this analog frequency modulated transmission mode.

MUSE's "1125-lines" are an analog measurement, which includes non-video "scan lines" during which a CRT's electron beam returns to the top of the screen to begin scanning the next field. Only 1035-lines have picture information. Digital signals count only the lines (rows of pixels) of the picture makeup as there are no other scanning lines (though conversion to an analogue format will introduce them), so NTSC's 525-lines become 480i, and MUSE would be 1035i.

Japan has since switched to a digital HDTV system based on ISDB; the original MUSE-based BS Satellite channel 9 (NHK BS Hi-vision) ended transmitting on November 30, 2007, moving to BS-digital channel 103.

Subsampling lives on in modern MPEG systems based on JPEG coding, as JPEG offers Chroma sub-sampling. High quality HD television has a sampling structure approximating 4:2:1 (Luma : Chroma : Saturation) for reference images (I-Frames), though 4:0.75:0.65 is probably typical for multi-channel delivery.

== HD-MAC ==
HD-MAC was a proposed television standard by the European Commission in 1986 (MAC standard). It was an early attempt by the EEC to provide HDTV in Europe. It was a complex mix of analog signal (Multiplexed Analog Components) multiplexed with digital sound. The video signal (1,250 (1,152 visible) lines/50 frames in 16:9 aspect ratio) was encoded with a modified D2-MAC encoder.

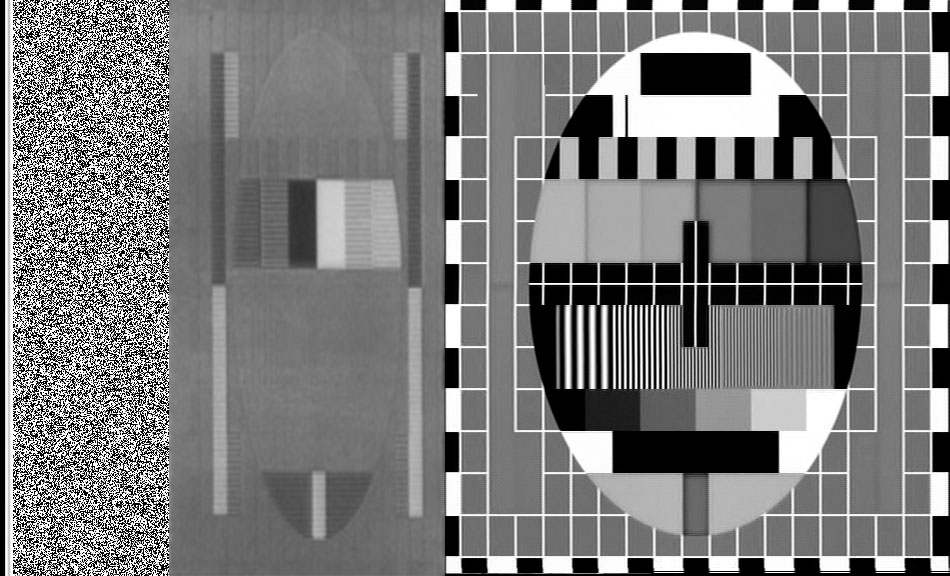
HD-MAC test pattern similar to the B-MAC test pattern

For the 1992 Summer Olympics, experimental HD-MAC broadcasting took place. 100 HD-MAC receivers (in that time, retroprojectors) in Europe were used to test the capabilities of the standard. This project was financed by the European Union (EU). The PAL-converted signal was used by mainstream broadcasters such as SWR, BR and 3Sat.

The HD-MAC standard was abandoned in 1993, and since then all EU and EBU efforts have focused on the DVB system (Digital Video Broadcasting), which allows both SDTV and HDTV.

== See also ==
The analog TV systems these systems were meant to replace

- SECAM
- NTSC
- PAL

Related standards

- NICAM-like audio coding is used in the HD-MAC system.
- Chroma subsampling in TV indicated as 4:2:2, 4:1:1 etc...

Electronovision, a video tape movie production technique based on the 819-line system.
