= Constantin Perskyi =

Russian scientist credited with coining the word television (1854-1906)

Constantine Perskyi
- Born: 2 June 1854; Tver Governorate, Russian Empire
- Died: 5 April 1906 (aged 51)
- Citizenship: Russian Empire
- Education: Mikhailovskaya military artillery Academy
- Engineering career
- Projects: Television

Constantin Dmitrievich Perskyi (Константин Дмитриевич Перский) (2 June 1854 – 5 April 1906) was a Russian scientist who is credited with coining the word television (télévision) in a paper that he presented in French at the 1st International Congress of Electricity, which ran from 18 to 25 August 1900 during the International World Fair in Paris. At the time, he was Professor of Electricity at the Artillery Academy of Saint Petersburg. His paper referred to the work of other experimenters in the field, including Paul Gottlieb Nipkow and Porfiry Ivanovich Bakhmetiev, who were attempting to use the photoelectric properties of selenium as the basis for their research in the field of image transmission.

== Biography ==
Konstantin Perskyi was born on 2 June (21 May according to the Julian calendar), 1854 in Tver Governorate. He belonged to a noble family founded by a person who had moved out of Persia in the service of the grand prince of Dmitry Donskoy.

He studied at the Michaylovsky Artillery College, and after graduation was a member of the squadron headed by the heir to the throne, the future tsar of Russia Alexander III. He took part in the Russo-Turkish War (1877—1878). In 1882 he graduated from the Michaylovsky Military Artillery Academy. Between 1883 and 1886, he studied at the Nikolay General Staff Academy, but was expelled for private reasons. His further service was in St. Petersburg as head of an ammunition (cartridge) workshop, and then of the whole factory, currently named after M.I Kalinin. Was a professor of electric technique at the Artillery Academy.

Konstantin Perskyi played an important role in the social life of St. Petersburg; he was a member of the Russian Technical Society; was academic secretary of the Electrotechnic Societ; and took part in All-Russia Electrotechnic Meetings.

Perskyi's practical studies were mostly related to the creation and development of gunnery (artillery) equipment.

In 1899 he presented the report «Современное состояние вопроса об электровидении на расстоянии (телевизирование)» at the First All-Russia Electrotechnic Congress in Saint Petersburg. Then, he presented the same report on 24 August 1900 in Paris at the Fourth International Electrotechnic Congress that was held under the auspices of the Exposition Universelle, where he first used the term "television", widely used afterwards. It was only a few years later that the term started being used in Russia.

On 5 April 1906, Colonel Perskyi was raised to the rank of Major General, and retired from active service for health reasons. He was awarded a pension, but died soon after.

== Awards ==
- Order of Saint Anna with the inscription "For bravery" for services in Russo-Turkish War (1877–1878)

== See also ==
- History of television
