= Kenjiro Takayanagi =

Japanese pioneer in the development of television (1899–1990)

Kenjirō Takayanagi
- 高柳 健次郎
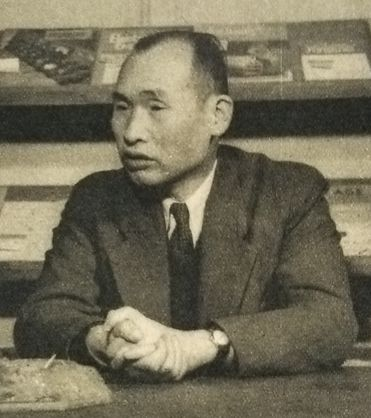
- Kenjirō Takayanagi in 1953
- Born: January 20, 1899; Hamamatsu, Shizuoka Japan
- Died: July 23, 1990 (aged 91); Yokosuka, Kanagawa, Japan
- Engineering career
- Discipline: Electrical engineering
- Significant advance: Development of television

Kenjiro Takayanagi (高柳 健次郎, Takayanagi Kenjirō; January 20, 1899 in Hamamatsu, Shizuoka – July 23, 1990 in Yokosuka) was a Japanese engineer and a pioneer in the development of television and video tape recorders. Although he failed to gain much recognition in the West, he built the world's first all-electronic television receiver, and is referred to as "the father of Japanese television".

== Career ==
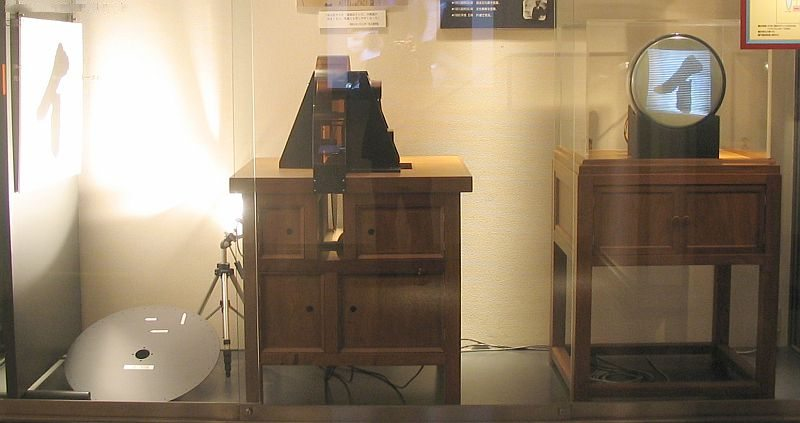
A recreation of Takayanagi's pioneering experiment, on display at the NHK Museum of Broadcasting in Atagoyama, Tokyo

In 1925, Takayanagi began research on television after reading about the new technology in a French magazine. He developed a system similar to that of John Logie Baird, using a Nipkow disk to scan the subject and generate electrical signals. Unlike Baird's display method, Takayanagi used a cathode ray tube to display the received signal, thereby demonstrating electronic image reception. On December 25, 1926, Takayanagi successfully demonstrated his system at Hamamatsu Industrial High School, where he was teaching at the time (the school is now the Faculty of Engineering at Shizuoka University). The first picture he transmitted was of the Japanese katakana character イ made up of 40 scan lines. This was several months before Philo T. Farnsworth demonstrated his first fully electronic system in San Francisco on September 7, 1927, which did not require a Nipkow disk. (See History of television.)

In subsequent years, Takayanagi continued to play a key role in the development of television at NHK (the Japan Broadcasting Corporation), where he worked on higher-line electronic television systems, including a 40-line image of a human face by 1933, and then at JVC (Victor Company of Japan), where he eventually became vice president. In the late 1950s, he developed a two-head, helical scan video tape recorder. He was also involved in the development of color television. In 1984, he created his own foundation for the study of electronics. In 1988, he became the first Japanese person to become an honorary member of the Society of Motion Picture and Television Engineers He died of pneumonia in 1990 at the age of 91.

== Honours ==
From the corresponding article in the Japanese Wikipedia

- Medal of Honour with Purple Ribbon – 29 April 1955
- Person of Cultural Merit – 3 November 1980
- Order of Culture – 3 November 1981
- SMPTE Honorary member – October 1988
- Grand Cordon of the Order of the Sacred Treasure – 29 April 1989 (Second Class, Gold and Silver Star: 3 November 1974)
- Work on development of television named an IEEE Milestone in 2009.
