= Boris Grabovsky =

Soviet scientist

Boris Pavlovich Grabovsky (Russian: Бори́с Па́влович Грабо́вский, Ukrainian: Бори́с Па́влович Грабо́вський, 26 May 1901 – 13 January 1966) was a Soviet engineer of Ukrainian descent who invented a first fully electronic TV set (video transmitting tube and video receiver) that was demonstrated in 1928. In 1925, one of the pioneers of television Boris Rosing advised and helped him apply for a patent (issued under No 5592) of a fully electronic TV set called Telefot. Boris is the son of the Ukrainian poet Pavlo Hrabovsky.

== Invention ==
In his method patented in 1925, Grabovsky proposed a new principle of the TV imaging based on the vertical and horizontal electron beam sweeping under high voltage that is widely used in the modern cathode-ray tubes. Historian and ethnographer Boris Golender (Ukrainian: Борис Голендер) in his video lecture described in details where and how the inventor Boris Grabovsky demonstrated a first fully electronic TV set to committee and public in summer 1928. Although this date of demonstration of the fully electronic TV set is the earliest known so far, most of the modern historians claim that either Vladimir Zworykin or Philo Farnsworth were supposedly first. Contribution made by Boris Grabovsky to the development of early television was acknowledged by the Government of the USSR.

== Biography ==
Boris Grabovsky was born in 1901 in Tobolsk, Siberia, where his father, a prominent Ukrainian poet Pavlo Hrabovsky was living in exile as a member of the Russian revolutionary movement Narodnaya Volya. After the death of his father the next year, the family moved to Odessa then to Kharkov. In 1917, they had to move to Central Asia, to Kyrgyz village Tokmok. He died in January 1966 in Frunze, the capital of the Kirgiz Soviet Socialist Republic.

=== Education ===
Boris Grabovsky started his education in Tashkent special school. Then he entered preparational faculty of Central Asian University in Tashkent where he worked with Prof. G. Popov. In the university he read articles by Boris Rosing in the field of electronic telescopy. Being excited by the idea of the transmission of images over a distance, he invented the cathode commutator, which was the first prototype of his transmitting tube.

== Honours ==
In 1965, Boris Grabovsky was awarded the title of the Honored Inventor of Uzbekistan.

In 1977, the museum of electronic television named Boris Grabovsky was founded in Tashkent.

There is a museum named after Boris Grabovsky in the Tyumen Industrial Institute.

There is a museum named after Boris Grabovsky in the village of Pushkarne (now Grabovske) in Sumy region .

In the Vinnytsia National Technical University at the Faculty of Radio Electronics in the early 2000s, a photo gallery of prominent scientists — radio pioneers with a description of their achievements was created. Ukrainian scientists (with Boris Grabovsky) are presented with Maxwell, Heinrich Hertz, Guglielmo Marconi, Nikola Tesla, Alexander Stepanovich Popov.
