= Boris Rosing =

Russian scientist and inventor (1869–1933)

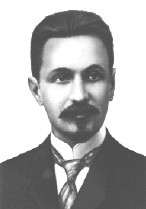
- Born: 5 May 1869; Saint Petersburg, Russia
- Died: 20 April 1933 (aged 63); Arkhangelsk, Soviet Union
- Education: Saint Petersburg Imperial University
- Scientific career
- Fields: Mechanical television

Boris Lvovich Rosing (Russian: Борис Львович Розинг; 5 May [O.S. 23 April] 1869 – 20 April 1933) was a Russian scientist and inventor of television.

== Biography ==
Boris Rosing was born in Saint Petersburg into the family of a government official. His father, Lev Nikolaevich Rozing, served on the commission for military service (conscription) under Czar Alexander II. Rozing was a descendant of the noble Rozing family, founded by Dutch immigrant Peter Rozing. Lev developed an interest in mathematics and technology, including recent inventions, which he communicated to his son. From 1879 to 1887, Boris studied at St. Petersburg's Vvdensky gymnasium, from which he graduated with a gold medal. There, he distinguished himself in his studies of the exact sciences, literature and music. He then studied physics and mathematics at St. Petersburg University, which was a major research center. The distinguished faculty included the chemist Dmitri Mendeleev and the mathematicians Pafnuty Chebyshev and Andrey Markov. After graduating with honors in 1891, he remained at the university to pursue graduate studies in physics. The subject of his dissertation was magnetic hysteresis. He discovered hysteresis in the lengths of iron wires in the presence of cyclic magnetic fields, a phenomenon that was discovered independently by the Japanese investigator Hantaro Nagaoka. He subsequently became a physics instructor at the St. Petersburg Institute of Technology. Starting in 1894, he also taught physics at the Konstantinovsky Artillery School, and from 1906, he lectured on electrical and magnetic measurements as part of women's polytechnic courses. During 1894–1900, he continued his studies of magnetism but also worked on several practical electrical problems. He taught at the St. Petersburg Institute of Technology until 1918. He then conducted research at the Leningrad Experimental Electrotechnical Laboratory from 1924 to 1928 and at the Central Laboratory for Wire Communications from 1928 to 1931.

== Television ==
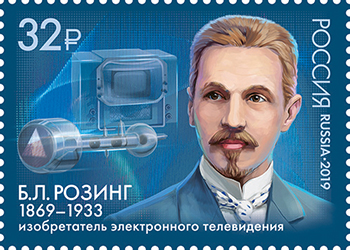
Boris Rosing featured on 2019 postage stamp of Russia

Rosing's interest in television — or the "electric telescope", as he called it — began in 1897. Others had tried to develop a mechanical version of television. Rosing recognized the shortcomings of mechanical television; he thought that the image should be displayed electrically on a cathode-ray tube (CRT). By 1902, Rosing began actual experimentation to test his ideas: he constructed a simple apparatus for electrically deflecting the beam of a CRT, which allowed him to draw figures on the tube's screen. At that time, mechanical devices scanned an image onto a selenium photoresistor, the resistance of which varied in response to the light striking it. However, selenium photoresistors responded to changes in light levels too slowly to accurately reproduce moving images. Therefore, Rosing used a photocell, a piece of alkaline metal in a vacuum tube which emitted electrons in response to light. Once Rosing had developed a rudimentary working television that incorporated his two innovations — a photocell detector and a CRT display — he filed a patent application in Russia on 25 July 1907 and — on the improved version of his system, which included magnetic deflection coils around the CRT — on 2 March 1911. He followed up with a demonstration of which a report was published in the Scientific American with diagrams and full description of the invention's operation. During 1912–1914, he did theoretical and experimental work on magnetic lenses. In 1918, he co-founded the North Caucasian Polytechnic Institute, now the Kuban State Technological University. In the early 1920s he resided in Krasnodar (formerly: Ekaterinodar), near the Black Sea. There, in 1920, he co-founded the Ekaterinodar Physical-Mathematical Society and became its chairman, and in 1923, he wrote his booklet The Electric Telescope: Vision at a distance.

Rosing's invention expanded on the designs of Paul Nipkow and his mechanical system of rotating lenses and mirrors. Accordingly, Rosing's system employed a mechanical camera device, but used very early CRTs (developed in Germany by Karl Ferdinand Braun) as a receiver. Rosing's Braun Tubes consisted of two parallel metal plates that were used to electrically shift the electron beam itself before it was scanned and reached the screen. These two plates were connected electrically to the photoelectric cell in the camera. Depending on the output of the photoelectric cells, the beam would be deflected up or down before entering the concentrating plate. Since this movement increased or decreased the number of electrons passing between the plates, it had the effect of varying the brightness of the electron beam. The system was primitive, but it was definitely one of the first experimental demonstrations where the CRT was employed for the purposes of television. V. K. Zworykin, who pioneered television in the United States and Germany, was a pupil of Rosing and assisted him in some of his laboratory work. In 1925, B. Rosing advised and helped young inventor Boris Grabovsky apply for a patent (issued under No 5592) of a fully electronic TV set, called Telefot.

Rosing continued his television research until 1931 when he was exiled as a counter-revolutionary to Kotlas without right to work, but in 1932 was moved to Arkhangelsk, where took up physics at the Forestry Technology Institute. Rosing died in exile in 1933 of cerebral hemorrhage. He was buried in the Arkhangelsk Vologda (formerly: Kuznechevskaya) cemetery.
