= Porfiry Bakhmetiev =

Russian scientist and physicist

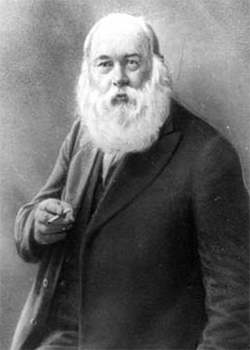
Porfiry Ivanovich Bakhmetiev

Porfiry Ivanovich Bakhmetiev (in Russian Порфирий Иванович Бахметьев; in Bulgarian Порфирий Иванович Бахметиев; in English also spelled as: Bachmetjev) (9 March 1860 in Moscow – 24 October 1913 in Moscow, Old Style 26 February 1860 – 14 October 1913) was a Russian and Bulgarian physicist and experimental biologist.

The son of a peasant, after graduating from his local school in Syzran, Samara Oblast, Russia, in 1883, he graduated from the University of Zurich in Switzerland writing a thesis on wandering electrical currents. Bakhmetiev was a Member of the Bulgarian Academy of Sciences and the founder of the Physical and Mathematical Society in Sofia in 1898.

Beginning 1890, Bakhmetiev taught at the University of Sofia and since 1895 as a professor. In 1913 he was a professor of biophysics at the Shanyavsky University in Moscow, Russia.

He specialized in the problems of ferromagnetism, geophysics and physical chemistry, biophysics, electricity, in particular thermoelectricity. For work in the field of thermoelectricity, the University of Boston awarded him the Thompson Prize, and in 1902 the St. Petersburg Academy of Sciences honored him (for success in entomology) with the prize of K. M. Baer Prize.

== Sources ==
- Проф. дфн Андрей Апостолов - Из историята на катедрата по физика на твърдото тяло и микроелектроника, Annuaire de l'Universite de Sofia "St. Kliment Ohridski", Faculté de Physique, 100, 2007.
