= Date A Live season 1 =

2013 Japanese anime series

Date A Live
- Season 1
- First season anime key visual
- No. of episodes: 12

Release
- Original network: Tokyo MX
- Original release: April 6 – June 22, 2013

Season chronology
- Next → Date A Live II

Date A Live is an anime series adapted from the light novels of the same title written by Kōshi Tachibana and illustrated by Tsunako. The story follows the adventures of Shido Itsuka and the Spirits, supernatural female entities that have fallen in love with him. The season was produced by Anime International Company and directed by Keitaro Motonaga, the first season, covering volumes 1 to 4 of the light novel series, was broadcast on Tokyo MX from April 6, 2013, to June 22, 2013. The opening theme is "Date A Live" (デート・ア・ライブ, Dēto A Raibu) sung by sweet ARMS, a vocal group consisting Iori Nomizu, Misuzu Togashi, Kaori Sadohara, and Misato. The first season uses four ending themes: "Hatsukoi Winding Road", by Kayoko Tsumita, Risako Murai and Midori Tsukimiya; "Save The World", "Save My Heart" and "Strawberry Rain" (ストロベリーレイン), all three by Nomizu.

== Episodes ==
No. overall	No. in season	Title (Note: All English titles are taken from Funimation.)	Ending theme	Original release date	Ref.
1	1	"April 10"; Transliteration: "Shigatsu Tōka" (Japanese: 四月十日)	"Hatsukoi Winding Road"	April 6, 2013	
The series begins with a spatial quake devastating the center of Eurasia. Thirty years have passed since the spatial quake, and the ditzy Kotori Itsuka and her adopted older brother Shidō live in Tengū City, Japan. For the opening ceremony, Kotori and Shido make a promise to meet at a diner later that day. As school ends for Shido, a spatial quake alarm sounds throughout the city for the citizens to enter shelter areas immediately. After being unable to contact his sister, Shido uses his GPS to confirm that she is still within the city according to their promise. He leaves the shelter to find her and in doing so, is outside when the spatial quake occurs and creates a giant crater, thus meeting a spirit-armor girl in the center. After a battle between the Spirit and the AST unit; those eradicate Spirits, where Shido witness his popular classmate Origami Tobiichi is a part of the AST, he meets the Ratatoskr organization on their airship, the Fraxinus, with serious Kotori the commander, and learn about the Spirits. He gets knowledge of his ability that can seal away Spirits' powers by making them fall in love with him.
2	2	"Close Re-encounter"; Transliteration: "Sai-sekkin Sōgū" (Japanese: 再接近遭遇)	"Save The World"	April 13, 2013	
Shido is undergoing stage two of his training which is practical application upon real humans. First is his teacher Tamae Okamine who, with the assistance of Reine Murasame and Kotori, falls head over heels in obsessive love with him. Running away from her, he bumps into Origami. He uses her for practice but ends up unintentionally starting a relationship with her. A spatial quake alarm occurs and the "Princess" Spirit is expected to appear at Raizen High School. With the students evacuated and part of the school destroyed by the spatial quake, Shido heads inside the school to confront Princess. Shido makes a connection with Princess and names her Tohka. The AST shows up in the air and engages Tohka from long range with their rifles to kill Tohka through the green shield but Origami sees Tohka with Shido and assumes she is holding him hostage. Since Shido is now her boyfriend, Origami battles Tohka in close combat, but is injured. The next day, Tohka appears before Shido as he is rummaging through the collateral damage so that they may go on their date.
3	3	"Sword That Splits the Sky"; Transliteration: "Sora Wakatsu Tsurugi" (Japanese: 空分かつ剣(つるぎ))	"Save My Heart"	April 20, 2013	
Following the incident at Raizen High School, Shido and Tohka are on their date being overseen and supported by the Fraxinus crew. Tohka mistakenly assumes that each variety of food she is consuming at first is a "date". Not accustomed to a crowd, when the couple enter the shopping area she assumes that humanity is launching an all-out attack on her. Origami observes them from the shadows while Shido and Tohka go from a high-priced restaurant to south of the station where they enter an improvised shopping area. Tohka is able to indulge in the foods present to her desire but notices that Shido does not seem to be having fun. They move on to an arcade that is dominated by crane games. In the course of playing for a prize that has caught Tohka's eye, Tohka inadvertently voices her bond with Shido. They make their way to a cliff edge where Tohka finally notice what a "date" is and sees why the "mecha people" want to keep the world that is so kind, fun and beautiful from getting destroyed. Meanwhile, Origami is given permission to kill her with a single blast but Shido intercepts Origami's blast. With Shido killed, Tohka furiously attacks a stunned Origami to avenge Shido. Before Tohka can kill Origami, Shido is mysterious revived with his wounds completely healed and falls from the sky towards Tohka. To prevent the city's destruction by a critical state <Halvanhelev>, Tohka kisses Shido while they glide down to the cliff edge as Tohka's Astral Dress disappears. Her last request is that Shido take her on a date again admitting that she's not ready to show her naked side yet.
4	4	"Unhappy Rain"; Transliteration: "Fukigen na Ame" (Japanese: 不機嫌な雨)	"Save The World"	April 27, 2013	
Tohka has transferred into Shido's class, where she and Origami immediately started a rivalry. Shido meets Yoshino for the first time while running through a shrine on a rainy, ill-forecast day. Believing her to be just a girl, he goes on about his way. At school, Tohka has made cookies and competes with Origami for Shido's attention. Arriving home, Shido learns that Tohka will be living in his house since he has sealed her powers. Kotori explains that it is also training as Shido still has to assist in sealing more Spirits. Later, as a spatial quake alarm goes off during school, Shido heads out to find it is Yoshino aka "Hermit" that is the cause. Tohka is left in the shelter while Shido goes out to meet Yoshino only to have Tohka follow him and witness the two accidentally having kissed. Tohka took the puppet and wouldn't let Yoshino have it back, only to provoke Yoshino who attacks while leaving. Utilizing her angel Zadkiel, Yoshino is also able to escape from the AST nearby while Origami eyes Yoshinon, Yoshino's puppet which Tohka dropped when she was defended by Shido from an attack.
5	5	"The Freezing Ground"; Transliteration: "Itetsuku Daichi" (Japanese: 凍て付く大地)	"Strawberry Rain"	May 4, 2013	
Tohka is avoiding Shido due to her feelings about what happened between him and Yoshino. She talks with Reine and receives advice and clarity about what occurred. During this time, Shido helps Yoshino look for her puppet, Yoshinon. Yoshino gets hungry while searching so the two go to Shido's house to eat. It's revealed that Yoshinon is Yoshino's friend because he is essentially a hero that is everything Yoshino wants to be. As Shido is getting close to Yoshino, Tohka barges is spouting an apology but misinterprets the situation. Yoshino disappears away, Tohka barges out again, but Shido learns from Kotori that Yoshinon is at Origami's place. Origami forcibly makes progress between them when Shido comes over but as the conversation turns to Spirits, she gets notice of a mission. Yoshino is being targeted by the AST but Shido plans to save her with Tohka's help. As Tohka acts as a decoy, Shido makes it through Yoshino's barrier with Yoshinon to fulfill his promise. With her trust in him established, Shido seals Yoshino's powers. In the last few scenes, it is revealed that the housing for the Spirits has been completed so that Tohka and Yoshino may move in.
6	6	"Hot Springs of Love"; Transliteration: "Koisuru Onsen" (Japanese: 恋する温泉)	"Save The World"	May 11, 2013	
Tohka and Yoshino decides to visit hot spring. So Shido makes the arrangement for them to go to Tenguu Gokuraku Hot Springs. Perverted Kyōhei Kannazuki persuades Kotori to go too but has been exposed that he has ulterior motives. His punishment is to dig a hole and refill it for the next week. Meanwhile, Ryōko Kusakabe of the AST is informed that the DEM Corporation is going to send reinforcements. A hot headed Ryōko also finds out from her member that due to the increase in the Spirit's alert level the group's vacation trip is cancelled. Instead, the AST member will take Ryōko to the hot spring that Shido's going to. Origami, uninterested at first, receives a phone call from Shido where she overhears that he'll be going to the hot spring with Tohka, reluctantly decides to go as well. While riding in the car, Yoshino is given affectionate attention by Shido which frustrates Tohka causing Rena's car and road to be wrecked forcing them to walk instead. This in turn disrupts the train the AST is riding underground. The AST arrive up the surface unknowingly going in the same direction as Shido's group on the way to the hot spring. Kotori orders the group to do everything to stop AST in their tracks, pushing a stressed out Ryoko to breaking point, ordering everyone to use full force, turning into an all out war, using ridiculous and absurd objects in Date Town, from sticky substance to sleeping gas. A stray ordnance causes Yoshinon to fly off after the explosion. Shido goes to find Yoshinon in the midst of the firefight and is almost killed by Ratatoskr's Destruct Mode. Tohka saves Shido from the attack while overseen by Origami and fellow AST members. Ryoko and her team reaches the hot springs but due to Yoshino's crying earlier, it has frozen a few members leading to another disappointment. Kyōhei dug up a hot spring that Kotori and the group end up enjoying themselves in. Mana Takamiya is then shown arriving in Japan after the credits.
7	7	"The Visitors"; Transliteration: "Raihōsha-tachi" (Japanese: 来訪者達)	"Save My Heart"	May 18, 2013	
Mana is having a 10 vs. 1 practice match against Origami's unit before having introduced herself at the briefing AST's previous battle with Hermit where she unknowingly reveals herself to be Shido's biological sister. Kurumi Tokisaki transfers into Shido's class revealing herself to be a Spirit. During her time touring the school with Shido they're followed by Origami and Tohka, but as Shido attempting to seduce Kurumi she is also attempting to do get closer to him. Kurumi code-named "Nightmare" is known to be the most deadly Spirit. After school, Kurumi kills three delinquents and is confronted by Mana. Mana then runs into Shido later on that day. Taking her to his house, what Mana shares about herself leads to a quarrel between her and Kotori but ultimately leaves everyone with more questions than answers. During school the next day, Shido finds out that Kurumi was killed during her confrontation with Mana yet she appeared at school. Origami questions Kurumi in a secluded place and finds out that Kurumi is pursuing Shido for his extended lifespan.
8	8	"Triple Frenzy"; Transliteration: "Sanjū Kyōsō Kyoku" (Japanese: 三重狂騒曲)	"Save The World"	May 25, 2013	
Shido invites Kurumi out but is forced on a polygamous date when Tohka seduces him and Origami forces her plans upon him for a date. Shido is unable to deny any of them as Tohka would be heartbroken, Origami would be suspicious and his plans to seal Kurumi depend on the date. With their dates occurring around the same time and their entertainment venues located rather close to each other, Ratatoskr assists Shido by teleporting him to each girl's location while monitoring their emotional levels. After Shido leaves Kurumi, she finds some boys shooting at a stray cat and convinces them to let her play with them. Ratatoskr loses sight of Kurumi as Origami and Tohka run into each other. After they both proclaim their trying to find Shido for their date, Origami runs off concerned there may be another. Shido returns to look for Kurumi but finds blood, body parts, and Kurumi killing a tormentor. As she holds Shido within her clutches, Mana intervenes wearing her CR Unit.
9	9	"Raging Nightmare"; Transliteration: "Kyōran no Akumu" (Japanese: 狂乱の悪夢)	"Save My Heart"	June 1, 2013	
Mana kills Kurumi and explains everything to Shido. After he is forced away, he avoids Origami and Tohka after running into them because of seeing the death Kurumi caused. Tohka finds out the reason for Shido's behavior and continues her date with him to try to cheer him up. After gaining some insight to Kurumi, the next day Shido declares to Kurumi that he'll save her. Kurumi goes to the school rooftop while encasing the school in her field to dissuade Shido from trying to save her. Mana is confronting Kotori about Ratatoskr and attempting to use it as leverage against Kotori so she'll release Shido from the potential danger he's in. While Kurumi is threatening the school and the town, Origami and Tohka are engaging in battles with other copies of Kurumi. Shido convinces Kurumi only for her to be killed by another Kurumi, since she can twist time using <Zaphkiel>. As Tohka and Origami show up, it's revealed that the hands in Kurumi's shadow are actually the hands of past versions of herself. Kurumi takes everyone hostage and attempts to blow a spatial quake only for it to be blown away. Kotori appears in her Astral Dress as the "Efreet" flame Spirit explaining the spatial quake cancellation and fights Kurumi.
10	10	"Spirit Of Fire (Ifrit)"; Transliteration: "Honō no Seirei (Ifurīto)" (Japanese: 炎の精霊(イフリート))	"Save The World"	June 8, 2013	
After a short conversation, Kurumi used one of her skills to make Kotori stay still, create copies of herself, and shoot Kotori a few times. Kotori fell over after Kurumi's last shot but Kotori's healing skill enables her to not die. Then, the shocked Kurumi sent her copies to kill Shido but he was pushed away by Kotori and the copies were killed. In the heat of the fight, Kurumi inhibits Kotori but it only worked for a while. Kotori used her weapon to shoot Kurumi after the frightened Kurumi summoned her copies to shield her. Shido tried to reason with Kotori to not kill Kurumi, but she ignored him, making Shido realize that Kotori is no longer herself. Immediately, he went to stand in front of Kurumi to shield her. After the shot launched, Kotori suddenly regained conscious and deflected the shot. Shido woke up on Fraxinus after dreaming of an event that happened 5 years ago. Being calmed down by Reine, he went to see Kotori regarding on her condition. He left in despair to meet Mana and Origami in the hospital. Unable to meet Mana, Shido instead met Origami, who tried to get him closer to herself. Before Shido exited Origami's room in the late evening, she told him of her intent to kill the flame Spirit to avenge her parents' death five years ago and that's the reason she joined AST.
11	11	"Countdown"; Transliteration: "Kauntodaun" (Japanese: カウントダウン)	"Save My Heart"	June 15, 2013	
Shido is contemplating the situation regarding Kotori involving the five-year event including the statements made by her and Origami about the residential fire. With Ratatoskr's headquarters personnel all agreeing that Ocean Park is the ideal venue for Shido's date, he undergoes training outlined by Reine involving Shido, Tohka and Yoshino to buy swimsuits. As Tohka asks about a swimsuit, Origami teases her that it's a new piece of anti-Spirit equipment. Finally, she inquires of Tohka about Efreet to the point of being overly polite in her questioning. Finding Tohka's information useless, Origami pressures Shido into viewing her choices of swimsuits. Tohka and Origami turn it into a contest in that whoever turns on Shido most gets to go on a date with him. Yoshino ultimately wins but back on Fraxinus, Shido watches the video of the fire from five years ago. Recognizing ordinary video noise as a Spirit (Phantom) initiates a series of flashbacks that lead to Shido blacking out. Tohka and Yoshino tag along the next day to help Kotori ease up and are able to partake. As Shido sees Kotori resorting to pharmaceuticals to counteract her deteriorating mental condition, his determination is invigorated leading him to take Kotori away alone. At the AST base, Origami gets a firsthand view of the DW-029 Annihilator Gear code-named "White Licorice" sent there by DEM Industries for use of Mana. In talking with Ryōko, she's indirectly told that they have footage of the battle between Kotori and Kurumi. In the last scene, Origami is staring at a frame from the footage showing Kotori as she realizes who Efreet is.
12	12	"Things You Can't Give Up"; Transliteration: "Yuzurenai Mono" (Japanese: 譲れないもの)	"Save The World"	June 22, 2013	
A frightened Kotori is with Shido at the amusement park riding various roller coasters and attractions on their date. Without communications, Ratatoskr can only monitor with Kyōhei making masochistic comments to the opportunities Shido should have taken. While separated, Yoshino tells Tohka what she overheard about Kotori being a Spirit and how Shido is trying to seal her powers. Origami steals the "White Licorice" and suddenly attacks Kotori as she is talking to Shido. Kotori changes into her Spirit form to fight back, and Origami enters into a rampage, going into a full offensive. Before Kotori strikes a finishing blow, Origami accused her of how she killed her parents, astonishing Kotori long enough for Origami to trap her. Shido intervenes, delaying Origami but as she is about to fire, Tohka and Yoshino arrive. Tohka strives to stop Origami but as her ordnance is exploding ever closer to Shido and Kotori, the latter two kiss effectively sealing Ifrit. Simultaneously, Shido and Kotori remember exactly what happened five years ago. Shido pleads with Origami as she reaches the operational limit of White Licorice and collapses from exhaustion. Kurumi is seen on a rooftop only commenting "This is not enough." Back on Fraxinus, Reine reveals that the real date wasn't necessary as Kotori's affection levels had not wavered since Shido first woke. Kotori returns to fill out reports asking if what Shido said was true. Kotori gets uncharacteristically embarrassed as he confirms his love of her, but Shido finishes saying simply as his sister he receives swift punishment. During the credits, it is shown that White Licorice has been returned to the AST while Origami is recovering in hospital under guard. As Shido and Tohka about to kiss they're interrupted by Ratatoskr and finally Yoshinon along with Yoshino simply say "To be continued. Sometime."
