= Betamax =

Discontinued Analog video cassette recording format

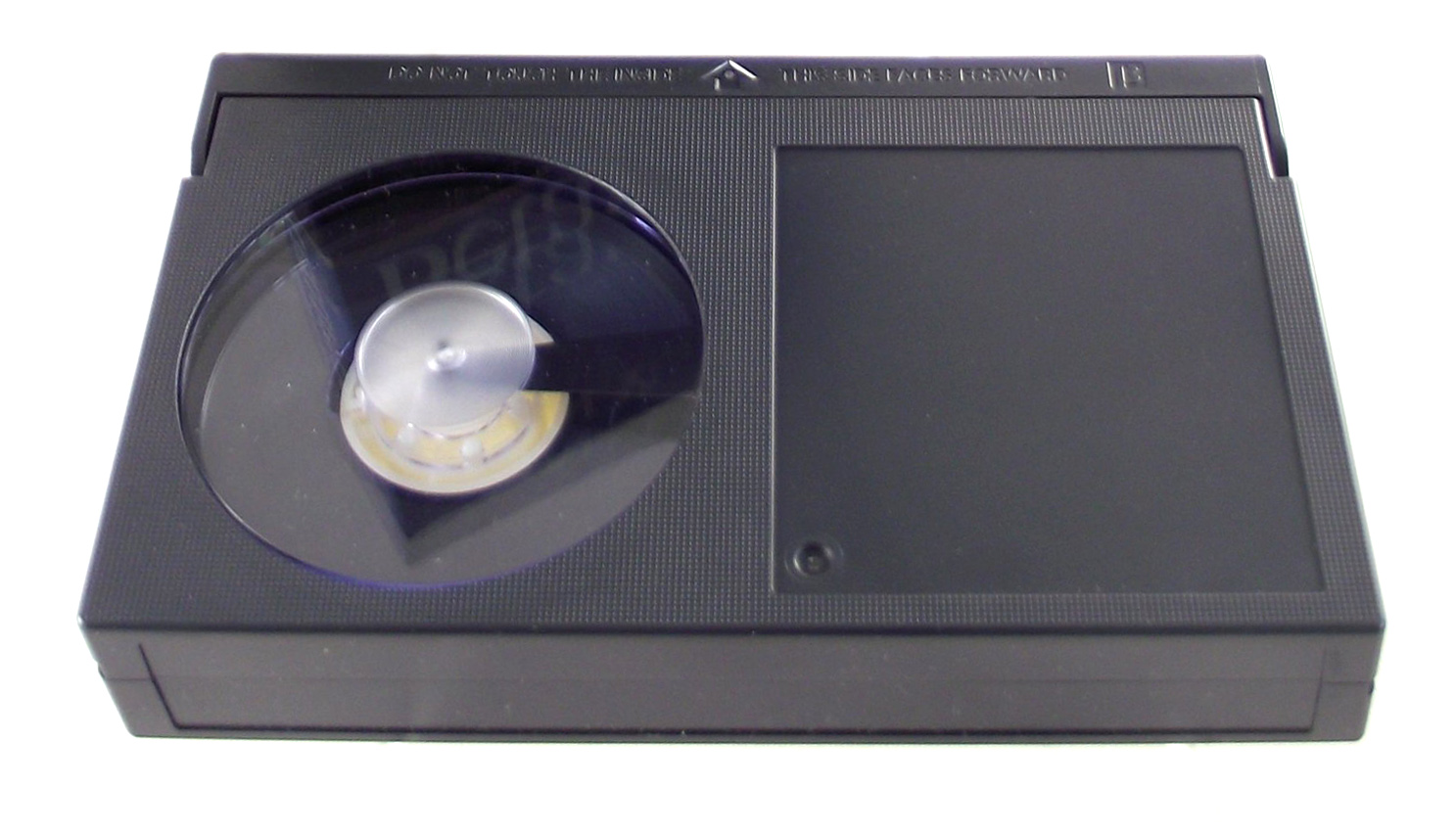
- Media type: Magnetic cassette tape, 1/2-inch
- Encoding: NTSC, PAL, SECAM
- Capacity: Up to 5 hours
- Read mechanism: Helical scan
- Write mechanism: Helical scan
- Standard: 525 lines, 625 lines
- Developed by: Sony
- Dimensions: 15.6 × 9.6 × 2.5 cm (6 1/7 × 3 3/4 × 1 inch)
- Usage: Home movies, home video
- Extended to: Betacam
- Released: May 10, 1975; 51 years ago
- Discontinued: Recorders discontinued August 2002; 24 years ago; Blank cassettes discontinued March 2016; 10 years ago

Betamax (also known as Beta, and stylized as the Greek letter β in its logo) is a discontinued consumer analog videocassette recording format developed by Sony. It was one of the main competitors in the videotape format war against its primary rival, VHS. Betamax was introduced in Japan on May 10, 1975, and launched in the United States later that year.

Betamax was widely regarded, in part due to Sony's marketing, as offering superior picture quality compared to VHS. Its initial β1 speed provided 250 horizontal lines of resolution, compared to VHS's 240 lines, but early Beta tapes were limited to 60 minutes of recording time, making them impractical for recording movies or sporting events. To address this, Sony introduced the β2 speed, which doubled recording time to two hours but reduced resolution, negating its technical advantage.

VHS's commercial success over Betamax was also driven by JVC's strategy of licensing the format broadly, spurring competition and lowering prices among manufacturers. In contrast, Sony initially resisted licensing Beta, limiting its market reach. By the late 1980s, Betamax's decline was evident, and in 1988 Sony tacitly acknowledged defeat when it announced it would add VHS models to its videocassette recorder (VCR) lineup.

Despite losing the format war, Sony continued producing Betamax recorders until August 2002 and sold blank Beta cassettes until March 2016; the latter date marked the end of the format's commercial lifespan.

== Original version ==
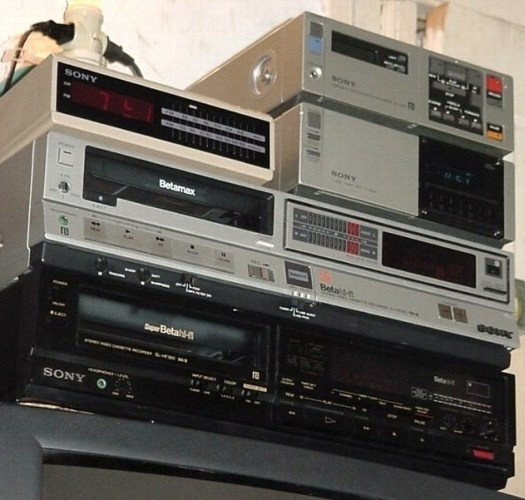
Three Sony Betamax VCRs built for the American market. Top to bottom: SL-2000 portable with TT-2000 tuner/timer "Base Station" (1982); SL-HF 300 Betamax HiFi unit (1984); SL-HF 360 SuperBeta HiFi unit (1988).

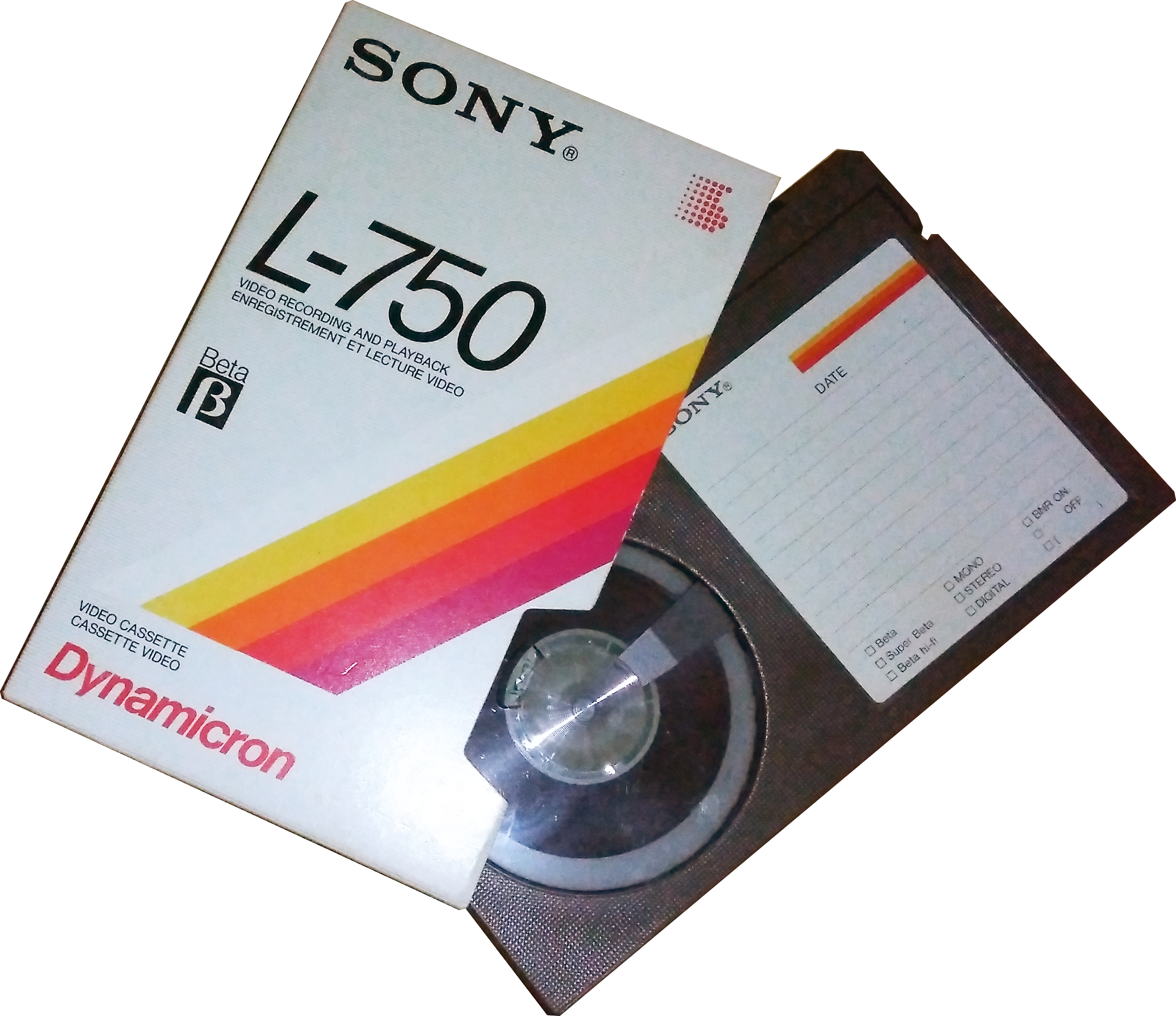
L-750 Betamax tape

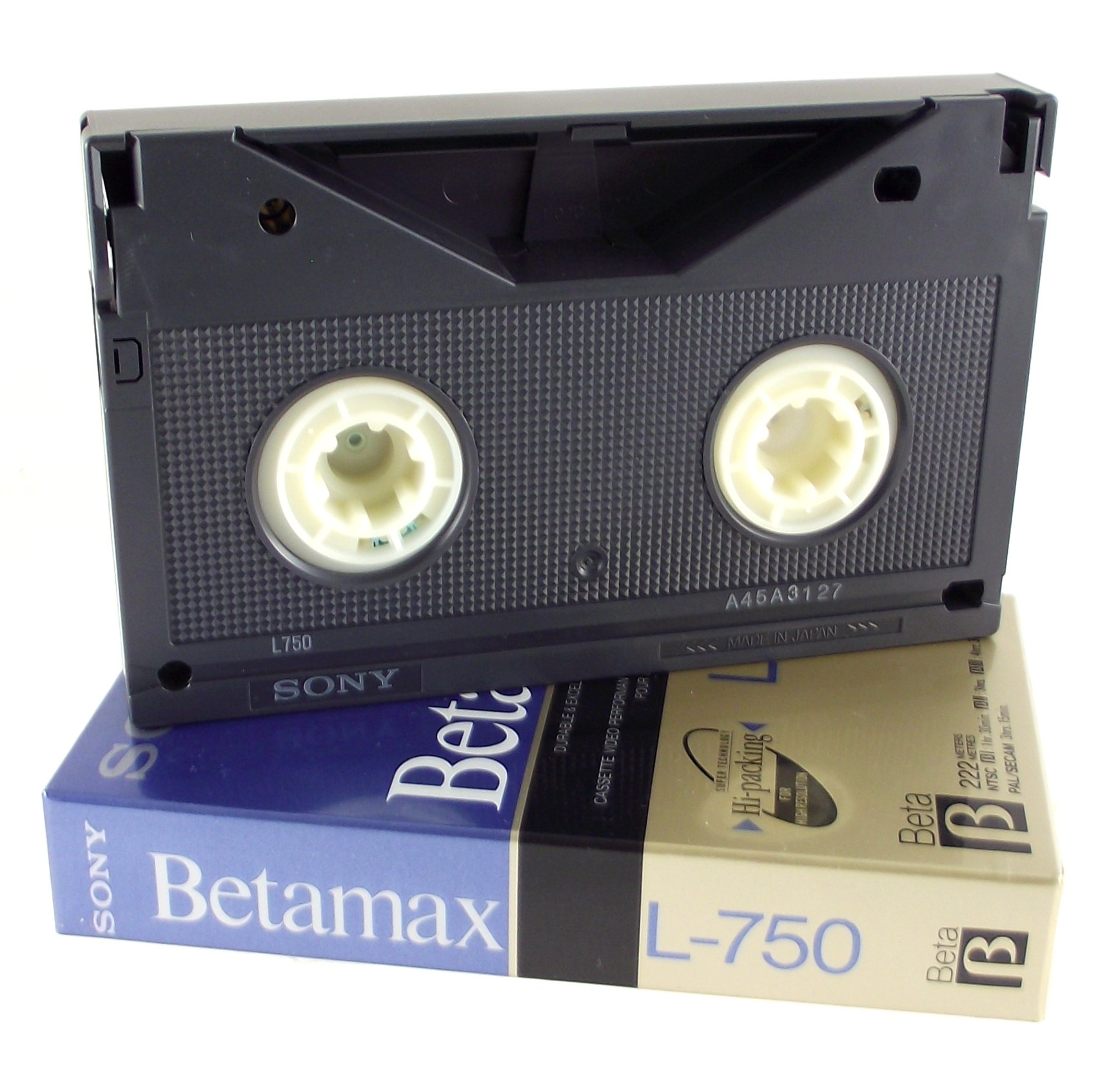
The underside of a Betamax cassette

=== Launch and early models ===
The first Betamax VCR introduced in the United States was the LV-1901 model, which included a 19-inch (48 cm) Trinitron television, and appeared in stores in early November 1975. The cassettes contain 0.50-inch-wide (12.7 mm) videotape in a design similar to that of the earlier, professional 0.75-inch-wide (19 mm), U-matic format.

Like the rival videotape format VHS, Betamax has no guard band and uses azimuth recording to reduce crosstalk. According to Sony's history webpages, the name had a double meaning: beta is the Japanese word used to describe the way in which signals are recorded on the tape; and the shape of the lowercase Greek letter beta (β) resembles the course of the tape through the transport. The suffix -max, from the word "maximum", was added to suggest greatness. In 1977, Sony issued the first long-play Betamax VCR, the SL-8200. This VCR had two recording speeds: normal, and the newer half speed. This provided two hours of recording on the L-500 Beta videocassette. The SL-8200 was to compete against the VHS VCRs, which allowed up to 4, and later 6 and 8, hours of recording on one cassette.

Initially, Sony was able to tout several Betamax-only features, such as BetaScan—a high-speed picture search in either direction—and BetaSkipScan (Peep Search), a technique that allowed the operator to see where they were on the tape by pressing the FF key (or REW, if in that mode): the transport would switch into the BetaScan mode until the key was released. Sony believed that the M-Load transports used by VHS machines made copying these trick modes impossible. BetaSkipScan (Peep Search) is now available on miniature M-load formats, but even Sony was unable to fully replicate this on VHS. BetaScan was originally called "Videola" until the company that made the Moviola threatened legal action.

Sanyo marketed its own Betamax-compatible recorders under the Betacord brand (also casually referred to as "Beta"). In addition to Sony and Sanyo, Beta-format video recorders were manufactured and sold by Toshiba, Pioneer, Murphy, Aiwa, and NEC. Zenith Electronics and WEGA contracted with Sony to produce VCRs for their product lines. The department stores Sears (in the United States and Canada) and Quelle (in Germany) sold Beta-format VCRs under their house brands, as did the RadioShack chain of electronic stores.

=== Industrial and professional usage ===
Sony also offered a range of industrial Betamax products, a Beta I-only format for industrial and institutional users. These were aimed at the same market as U-matic equipment, but were cheaper and smaller. The arrival of Betacam reduced the demand for both industrial Beta and U-matic equipment.

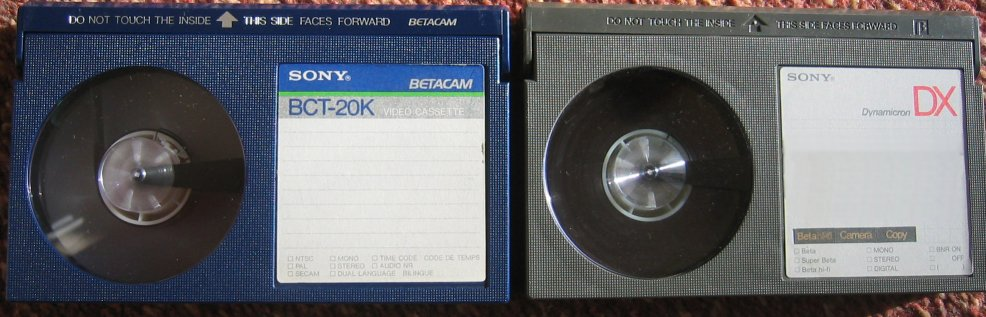
The early-form Betacam tapes (left) are interchangeable with Betamax (right), though the recordings are not.

For the professional and broadcast video industry, Sony derived Betacam from Betamax. Released in 1982, Betacam became the most widely used videotape format in electronic news gathering, replacing the .75 in (19 mm) wide U-matic tape format. Betacam and Betamax are similar in some ways- early versions of Betacam used the same videocassette shape, used the same oxide tape formulation with the same coercivity, and recorded linear audio tracks in the same location of the tape. However, in the key area of video recording, Betacam and Betamax use completely different on-tape formats.

Betamax also had a significant part to play in the music recording industry, when Sony introduced its pulse-code modulation (PCM) digital recording system as an encoding box/PCM adaptor that connected to a Betamax recorder. The Sony PCM-F1 adaptor was sold with a companion Betamax VCR SL-2000 as a portable digital audio recording system. Many recording engineers used this system in the 1980s and 1990s to make their first digital master recordings. Later models using the same format included the Sony PCM-501ES, PCM-601ES (includes S/PDIF input and outputs) and PCM-701ES.

=== Court case ===
One other major consequence of the Betamax technology's introduction to the U.S. was the lawsuit Sony Corp. v. Universal City Studios (1984, the "Betamax case"), with the U.S. Supreme Court determining home videotaping to be legal in the United States, wherein home videotape cassette recorders were a legal technology since they had substantial noninfringing uses. This precedent was later invoked in MGM v. Grokster (2005), where the high court agreed that the same "substantial noninfringing uses" standard applies to authors and vendors of peer-to-peer file sharing software (notably excepting those who "actively induce" copyright infringement through "purposeful, culpable expression and conduct").

== Later developments and offshoots ==
=== HiFi audio upgrade ===
In June 1983, Sony introduced high fidelity audio to videotape as Beta Hi-Fi. For NTSC, Beta HiFi worked by placing a pair of FM carriers between the chroma (C) and luminance (Y) carriers, a process known as frequency multiplexing. Each head had a specific pair of carriers; in total, four individual channels were employed. Head A recorded its hi-fi carriers at 1.38(L) and 1.68(R) MHz, and the B head employed 1.53 and 1.83 MHz. The result was audio with an 80 dB dynamic range, with less than 0.005% wow and flutter.

Prior to the introduction of Beta Hi-Fi, Sony shifted the Y carrier up by 400 kHz to make room for the four FM carriers that would be needed for Beta Hi-Fi. All Beta machines incorporated this change, plus the ability to hunt for a lower frequency pre-AFM Y carrier. Sony incorporated an "antihunt" circuit, to stop the machine hunting for a Y carrier that was not there.

Some Sony NTSC models were marketed as "Hi-Fi Ready" (with an SL-HFR prefix to the model's number instead of the usual SL or SL-HF). These Betamax decks looked like a regular Betamax model, except for a special 28-pin connector on the rear. If the user desired a Beta Hi-Fi model but lacked the funds at the time, they could purchase an "SL-HFRxx" and at a later date purchase the separate Hi-Fi Processor. Sony offered two outboard Beta Hi-Fi processors, the HFP-100 and HFP-200. They were identical except that the HFP-200 was capable of multi-channel TV sound, with the word "stereocast" printed after the Beta Hi-Fi logo. This was possible because unlike a VHS Hi-Fi deck, an NTSC Betamax did not need an extra pair of heads. The HFP-x00 would generate the needed carriers which would be recorded by the attached deck, and during playback, the AFM carriers would be passed to the HFP-x00. They also had a small "fine tracking" control on the rear panel for difficult tapes.

For PAL, however, the bandwidth between the chroma and luminance carriers was not sufficient to allow additional FM carriers, so depth multiplexing was employed, wherein the audio track would be recorded in the same way that the video track was. The lower-frequency audio track was written first by a dedicated head, and the video track recorded on top by the video head. The head disk had an extra pair of audio-only heads with a different azimuth, positioned slightly ahead of the regular video heads, for this purpose.

Sony was confident that VHS could not achieve the same audio performance feat as Beta Hi-Fi. However, to the chagrin of Sony, JVC did develop a VHS hi-fi system on the principle of depth multiplexing approximately a year after the first Beta Hi-Fi VCR, the SL-5200 was introduced by Sony. Despite initial praise as providing "CD sound quality", both Beta Hi-Fi and VHS HiFi suffered from "carrier buzz", where high-frequency information bled into the audio carriers, creating momentary "buzzing" and other audio flaws. Both systems also used companding noise-reduction systems, which could create "pumping" artifacts under some conditions. Both formats also suffered from interchange problems, where tapes made on one machine did not always play back well on other machines. When this happened and if the artifacts became too distracting, users were forced to revert to the old linear soundtrack.

=== SuperBetamax / Hi-Band ===
In early 1985, Sony would introduce a new feature, Hi-Band or SuperBeta, by again shifting the Y carrier—this time by 800 kHz. This improved the bandwidth available to the Y sideband and increased the horizontal resolution from 240 to 290 lines on a regular-grade Betamax cassette. Since over-the-antenna and cable signals were only 300–330 lines resolution, SuperBeta could make a nearly identical copy of live television. However, the chroma resolution still remained relatively poor, limited to just under 0.4 MHz or approximately 30 lines resolution, whereas live broadcast chrominance resolution was over 100 lines. The heads were also narrowed to 29 μm to reduce crosstalk, with a narrower head gap to play back the higher carrier frequency at 5.6 MHz. Later, some models would feature further improvement, in the form of Beta-Is, a high band version of the Beta-I recording mode. There were some incompatibilities between the older Beta decks and SuperBeta, but most could play back a high band tape without major problems. SuperBeta decks had a switch to disable the SuperBeta mode for compatibility purposes. (SuperBeta was only marginally supported outside of Sony, as many licensees had already discontinued their Betamax line.)

=== ED-Beta (Extended Definition Betamax) ===
Logo of ED-Beta

In 1988, Sony would again push the envelope with ED-Beta, or "Extended Definition" Betamax, capable of up to 500 lines of luma resolution, comparable to then-future DVD quality. In order to store the ~6.5 MHz–wide luma signal, with the peak frequency at 9.3 MHz, Sony used a metal formulation tape borrowed from the Betacam SP format (branded "ED-Metal") and incorporated some improvements to the transport to reduce mechanically induced aberrations in the picture. ED-Beta also featured a luminance carrier deviation of 2.5 MHz, as opposed to the 1.2 MHz used in SuperBeta, improving contrast with reduced luminance noise. Chroma resolution remained unchanged, which made artifacts like color fringing more pronounced. To cancel chroma signal crosstalk, the chroma portion of the signal was delayed by one or two scan lines during playback, smearing the color even more. The chroma delay could be disabled on higher end VCRs by turning on EDIT mode to "reduce editing faults" when dubbing a tape.

Sony introduced two ED decks and a camcorder in the late 1980s. The top end EDV-9500 (EDV-9300 in Canada) deck was a very capable editing deck, rivaling much more expensive U-matic set-ups for its accuracy and features, but did not have commercial success due to lack of timecode and other pro features. Sony did market ED-Beta to "semiprofessional" users, or "prosumers". As for the EDC-55 "ED CAM" camcorder, the major complaint concerned its low light sensitivity due to the use of two CCDs instead of the typical single-CCD imaging device. ED-Beta machines only recorded in βII and βIII modes, with the ability to play back βI and βIs.

=== Portable equipment and Betamovie camcorders ===
Two-piece portable video systems (those featuring a portable VCR such as Sony's "BetaPak") and a separate camera) soon became available for amateur and low-end video production. To better compete with Super 8 film there was the need for a less cumbersome all-in-one solution, and Sony's was "Betamovie", the first consumer camcorder.

Betamovie used standard-size Betamax cassettes. However, the changes required to miniaturise the mechanism forced the use of non-standard record signal timing. As a result, while the final on-tape recording is – by design – in standard Betamax format and playable on a regular Beta deck, the camcorder itself is record-only, and cannot be used to review or play back footage; it also effectively restricted Betamovie to those who also owned or had access to the Beta VCRs needed to view recordings.

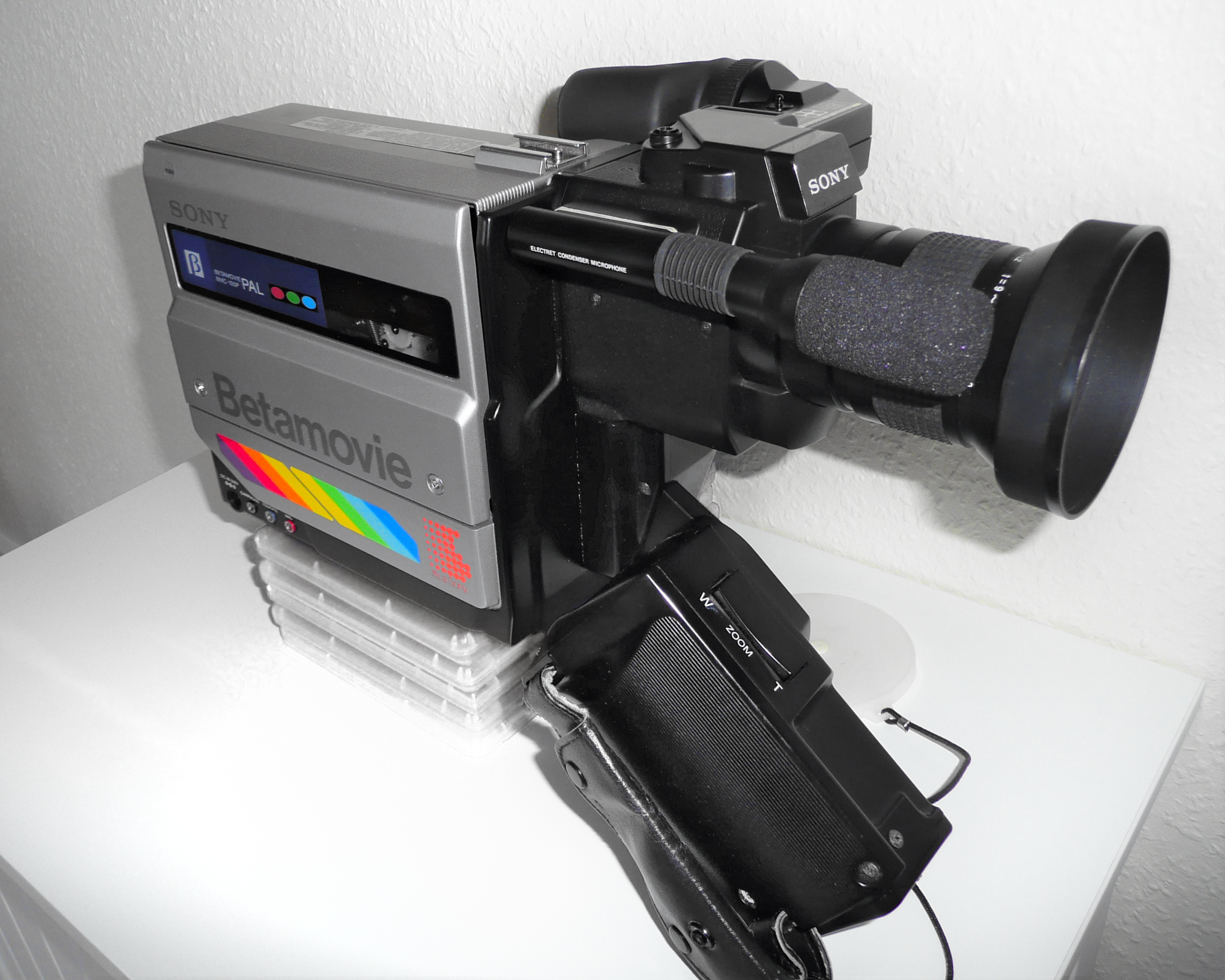
Sony Betamovie BMC-100P, the first of the Betamovie line and the first consumer-grade camcorder

VHS manufacturers found a different solution to drum miniaturization using standard video signals instead, permitting footage to be reviewed on the camcorder itself, and output to another VCR for editing. This was a huge advantage, as even owners of Beta VCRs could use a VHS camcorder to copy and edit footage to their Beta deck; this was not possible with Betamovie.

VHS gained another advantage with VHS-C, which used a miniaturized cassette to make a camcorder smaller and lighter than any Betamovie. Sony could not duplicate the functionality of VHS-C camcorders, and seeing the rapid loss of market share, eventually introduced the Video8 format. Their hope was that Video8 could replace both Beta and VHS for all uses.

SuperBeta and industrial Betamovie camcorders would also be sold by Sony.

== Discontinuation and legacy ==
=== End of production ===
On November 10, 2015, Sony announced that it would no longer be producing Betamax videocassettes. Production and sales ended March 2016 after almost 41 years of continuous production. Third-party manufacturers continue to make new cassettes. While these cassettes are designed for use with the Betacam format, the oxide formulation cassettes are interchangeable with traditional Betamax systems.

Despite the sharp decline in sales of Betamax recorders in the late 1980s and subsequent halt in production of new recorders by Sony in 2002, Betamax, SuperBetamax and ED-Beta are still being used by a small number of people. Even though Sony stopped making new cassettes in 2016, new old stocks of Betamax cassettes are still available for purchase at online shops and used recorders (as well as cassettes) are often found at flea markets, thrift stores or on Internet auction sites. Early format Betacam cassettes—which are physically based on the Betamax cassette—continue to be available for use in the professional media. It is still used by few broadcasters, as it was succeeded by Betacam SP, its digital modifications and more recently by tapeless recording.

=== Legacy ===
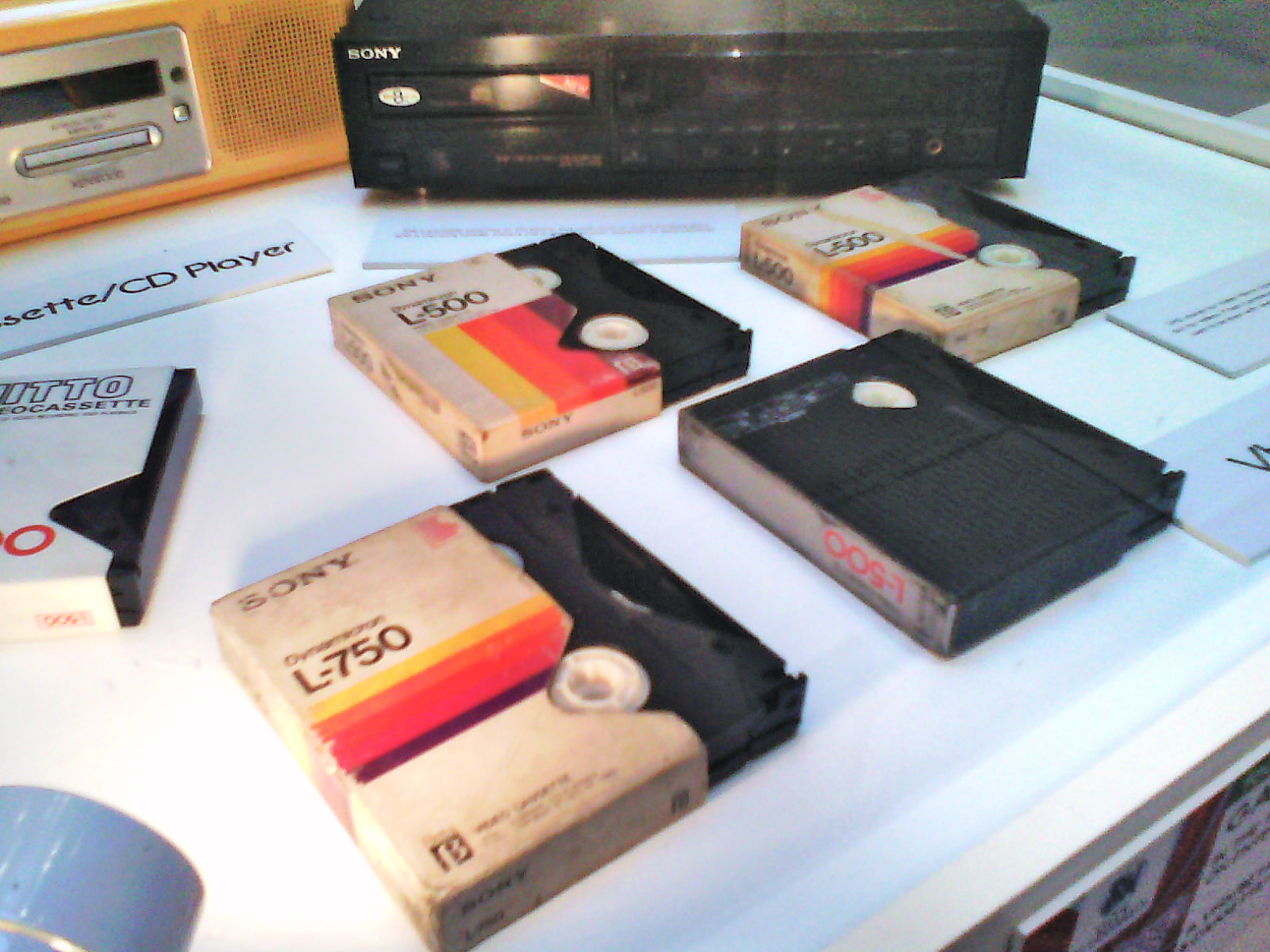
Betamax tapes on display at a museum

The VHS format's defeat of the Betamax format became a classic marketing case study. Sony's attempt to dictate an industry standard backfired when JVC made the tactical decision to forgo Sony's offer of Betamax in favor of developing its own technology. JVC felt that accepting Sony's offer would yield results similar to the U-matic deal, with Sony dominating.

By 1980, JVC's VHS format controlled 60% of the North American market. The large economy of scale allowed VHS units to be introduced to the European market at a far lower cost than the rarer Betamax units. In the United Kingdom, Betamax held a 25% market share in 1981; however, by 1986, it was down to 7.5% and continued to decline further. By 1984, 40 companies made VHS format equipment in comparison with Beta's 12. Sony finally conceded defeat in 1988 when it, too, began producing VHS recorders (early models were made by Hitachi), though it still continued to produce Betamax recorders until 2002.

In Japan, Betamax had more success and eventually evolved into Extended Definition Betamax, with 500+ lines of resolution.

== Technical details ==
=== Comparison with other video formats ===
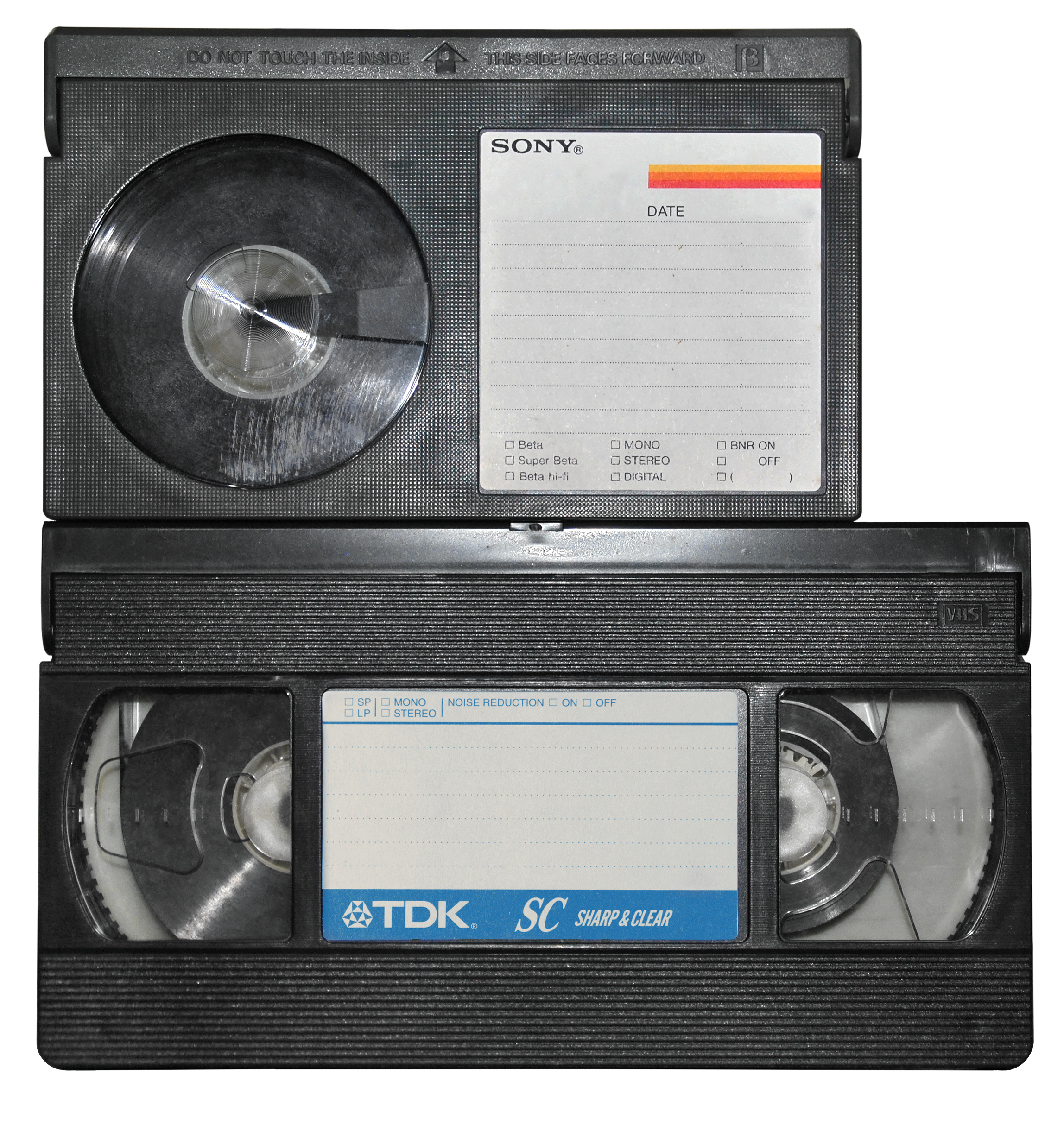
Size comparison between a Betamax cassette (top) and a VHS cassette (bottom)

The heads on the drum of a Betamax VCR move across the tape producing a writing speed of 6.9 or 5.832 metres per second with the drum rotating at 1800 rpm (NTSC, 60 Hz) or 1500 rpm (PAL, 50 Hz), theoretically giving Betamax a higher bandwidth of 3.2 MHz, thus better video quality than VHS. The tape moves at 2 cm/sec (βII, 60 Hz), 1.33 cm/sec (βIII, 60 Hz) or 1.873 cm/sec (50 Hz). The original βI speed was 4 cm/sec.

Below is a list of modern, digital-style resolutions (and traditional analog "TV lines per picture height" measurements) for various media. The list only includes popular formats. Listed resolution applies to luminance only, with chroma resolution usually halved in each dimension for digital formats, and significantly lower for analog formats.

Equivalent pixel resolutions are calculated from analog line resolution numbers:

Standard	Digital or analog?	Luminance resolution	Chroma resolution
Standard	Digital or analog?	(equivalent pixel resolution)	
VHS, CED (NTSC)	Analog	240 lines (320×486)	30 lines (40×486)
U-matic, Betamax, VHS HQ, Video8 (NTSC)	Analog	250 lines (333×486)	30 lines (40×486)
SuperBeta (NTSC)	Analog	290 lines (387×486)	30 lines (40×486)
Betacam (NTSC)	Analog	290 lines (387×486)	100 lines (100×486)
Type C (NTSC)	Analog	300 lines (400×486)	120 lines (120×486)
Broadcast (NTSC, PAL-M, and SECAM-M)	Analog	330 lines (440×486)	120 lines (120×486)
Betacam SP (NTSC)	Analog	340 lines (453×486)	100 lines (100×486)
Type A (NTSC)	Analog	350 lines (467×486)	120 lines (120×486)
S-VHS, Hi8 (NTSC)	Analog	420 lines (560×486)	30 lines (40×486)
LaserDisc (NTSC)	Analog	420 lines (560×486)	120 lines (120×486)
ED Beta (NTSC)	Analog	500 lines (667×486)	30 lines (40×486)
Quadruplex (NTSC)	Analog	512 lines (683×486)	120 lines (120×486)
Type B (NTSC)	Analog	520 lines (693×486)	120 lines (120×486)
IVC 9000 (NTSC)	Analog	570 lines (760×486)	120 lines (120×486)
VHS, CED (PAL)	Analog	240 lines (320×576)	30 lines (40×288)
U-matic, Betamax, VHS HQ, Video8 (PAL)	Analog	250 lines (333×576)	30 lines (40×288)
SuperBeta (PAL)	Analog	290 lines (387×576)	30 lines (40×288)
Betacam (PAL)	Analog	290 lines (387×576)	100 lines (100×288)
Type C (PAL)	Analog	300 lines (400×576)	120 lines (120×288)
Broadcast (PAL-N)	Analog	330 lines (440×576)	120 lines (120×288)
Betacam SP (PAL)	Analog	340 lines (453×576)	100 lines (100×288)
Type A (PAL)	Analog	350 lines (467×576)	120 lines (120×288)
Broadcast (PAL-B/G/H and SECAM-B/G)	Analog	390 lines (520×576)	120 lines (120×288)
S-VHS, Hi8 (PAL)	Analog	420 lines (560×576)	30 lines (40×288)
LaserDisc (PAL)	Analog	420 lines (560×576)	120 lines (120×288)
Broadcast (PAL-I)	Analog	430 lines (573×576)	120 lines (120×288)
Broadcast (PAL-D/K and SECAM-D/K/L)	Analog	470 lines (627×576)	120 lines (120×288)
ED Beta (PAL)	Analog	500 lines (667×576)	30 lines (40×288)
Type B (PAL)	Analog	624 lines (832×576)	120 lines (120×288)
Quadruplex (PAL)	Analog	640 lines (854×576)	120 lines (120×288)
IVC 9000 (PAL)	Analog	684 lines (912×576)	120 lines (120×288)
Video CD	Digital	260 lines (352×240)	130 lines (176×120)
Digital Betacam (NTSC)	Digital	540 lines (720×486)	270 lines (360×486)
Digital Betacam (PAL)	Digital	540 lines (720×576)	270 lines (360×576)
SVCD	Digital	360 lines (486×480)	180 lines (240×240)
Anamorphic DVD (NTSC)	Digital	410 lines (720×480)	205 lines (360×240)
Letterbox DVD (NTSC, PAL)	Digital	410 lines (720×360)	205 lines (360×180)
Anamorphic DVD (PAL)	Digital	720×576	360×288
4:3 DVD, DV, MiniDV, Digital8 (NTSC)	Digital	540 lines (720×480)	270 lines (360×240)
AVCHD Lite (720p)	Digital	720 lines (1280×720)	360 lines (640×360)
16:9 HDV	Digital	810 lines (1440×1080)	405 lines (720×540)
AVCHD, Blu-ray, HD DVD (1080p/1080i)	Digital	1080 lines (1920×1080)	540 lines (960×540)

The somewhat unintuitive analog resolution loss for 16:9 DVD compared to 4:3 DVD arises because analog resolution unit is "lines per picture height". When picture height is kept the same, the same 720 pixels are spread to a wider area in 16:9, hence lower horizontal resolution per picture height.

=== Tape lengths ===
Both NTSC and PAL/SECAM Betamax cassettes are physically identical (although the signals recorded on the tape are incompatible). However, as tape speeds differ between NTSC and PAL/SECAM, the playing time for any given cassette will vary accordingly between the systems. Other unusual lengths were produced from time to time, such as L-410.

- For NTSC only, βI is standard speed, βII is 1/2 speed, βIII is 1/3 speed.

Common tape lengths
Tape label	Tape length		Recording time				
Tape label	ft	m	βI	βII	βIII	PAL/SECAM	BETACAM
L-125	125	38	15 min	30 min	45 min	32 min	-
L-165	166 2/3	51	20 min	40 min	60 min (1 h)	43 min	-
L-250	250	76	30 min	60 min (1 h)	90 min (1:30 h)	65 min (1:05 h)	10 min
L-370	375	114	45 min	90 min (1:30 h)	135 (2:15 h)	96 min (1:36 h)	-
L-500	500	152	60 min (1 h)	120 min (2 h)	180 min (3 h)	130 min (2:10 h)	20 min
L-750	750	229	90 min (1:30 h)	180 min (3 h)	270 min (4:30 h)	195 min (3:15 h)	30 min
L-830	833 1/3	254	100 min (1:40 h)	200 min (3:20 h)	300 min (5 h)	216 min (3:36 h)	-

== In popular culture ==
In the 1983 David Cronenberg film Videodrome, the character of Max Renn grows an opening in his belly that accepts Betamax videocassettes. The Betamax format was chosen because the cassettes were slightly smaller than VHS cassettes, and thus made the prosthetics easier to construct.

In the second episode of BBC comedy The Mighty Boosh's second season (broadcast 2005), the Betamax Bandit features as an antagonist. In the episode, the Betamax Bandit is a monster whose form is primarily composed of Betamax tape material.

In the 2006 episode of Doctor Who entitled The Idiot's Lantern, the Tenth Doctor beats the episode's main enemy and entraps her for all eternity in a videotape he created thirty years too early as the episode is set in 1953. He shrugs off the effect it will have on the timelines as he calls it "just Betamax".

In the Cowboy Bebop episode "Speak Like a Child", Jet and Spike receive a Beta tape in the mail intended for Faye. Jet and Spike visit a shop in hopes of finding a Betamax player, which they do, but it is subsequently damaged beyond repair by Spike's impatience with the old device.

In the 2008 Pixar movie WALL-E, WALL-E watches some excerpts of the film Hello, Dolly! on what is presumed to be an old Betamax tape. However close inspection of the shot shows that it is really a BetacamSP cassette, which may be an error on the filmmakers' part.

The Tagalog song "Betamax" by the Filipino band Sandwich from their fifth studio album in 2008 entitled <S> Marks the Spot talks about an era in the Philippines before the advent of the Internet, MP3s, and DVDs, and the only widespread video format was Betamax. Also in the Philippines, Betamax refers to the popular cubed street food made of chicken or pig's blood served in skewers which bear a crude resemblance to Betamax cartridges.

In 2017, in Despicable Me 3, the villain Balthazar Bratt, whose look, culture, accessories and weapons date from the 80's, yells "Son of a Beta max" at his opponent Gru.

In 2019, episode 3, season 1 of Good Omens, a prophecy is mentioned from the book of Agnes Nutter book of prophecies saying: "Do not buy Betamax," and referring to the year 1972.

== See also ==
- Betacam – Umatic's replacement. A non-compatible, high-quality standard used by television studios and other professionals
- DigiBeta – Betacam's replacement. A non-compatible, digital high-quality standard used by television studios and other professionals
- Compact Video Cassette – Competitor product developed by Funai and Technicolor using 1/4″ tape format
- Peep search – A picture search system pioneered with Betamax and available on most video formats since
- U-matic – The predecessor to Betamax, using 3/4-inch tape instead of 1/2-inch
- Video8 – A small form factor tape based upon Betamax technology, using 8 mm tape
- Videotape format war - With research firm Enterprise Strategy Group announcing that VHS won over Betamax due to its more open format
