= Elektronika VM-12 =

First Soviet household VHS video cassette recorder

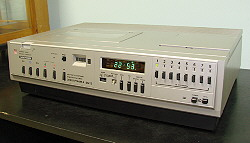
Elektronika VM-12

Elektronika VM-12 was the first Soviet VHS-compatible videocassette recorder. It was able to record SECAM-IIIB D/K (OIRT), PAL and black-and-white video on a 12.65 mm (0.498 in) wide magnetic tape.

Elektronika VM-12 was 480 mm × 367 mm × 136 mm (18.9 in × 14.4 in × 5.4 in) in size and weighed 10 kg (22 lb). PAL SP - 2,339±0.5%

The device was developed on the basis of the Panasonic NV-2000 video cassette recorder manufactured in Japan starting 1981. The equipment for the production of some parts and units was purchased in Japan as well.

The VM-12 was produced from 1984 until about 1995.
