= Tint control =

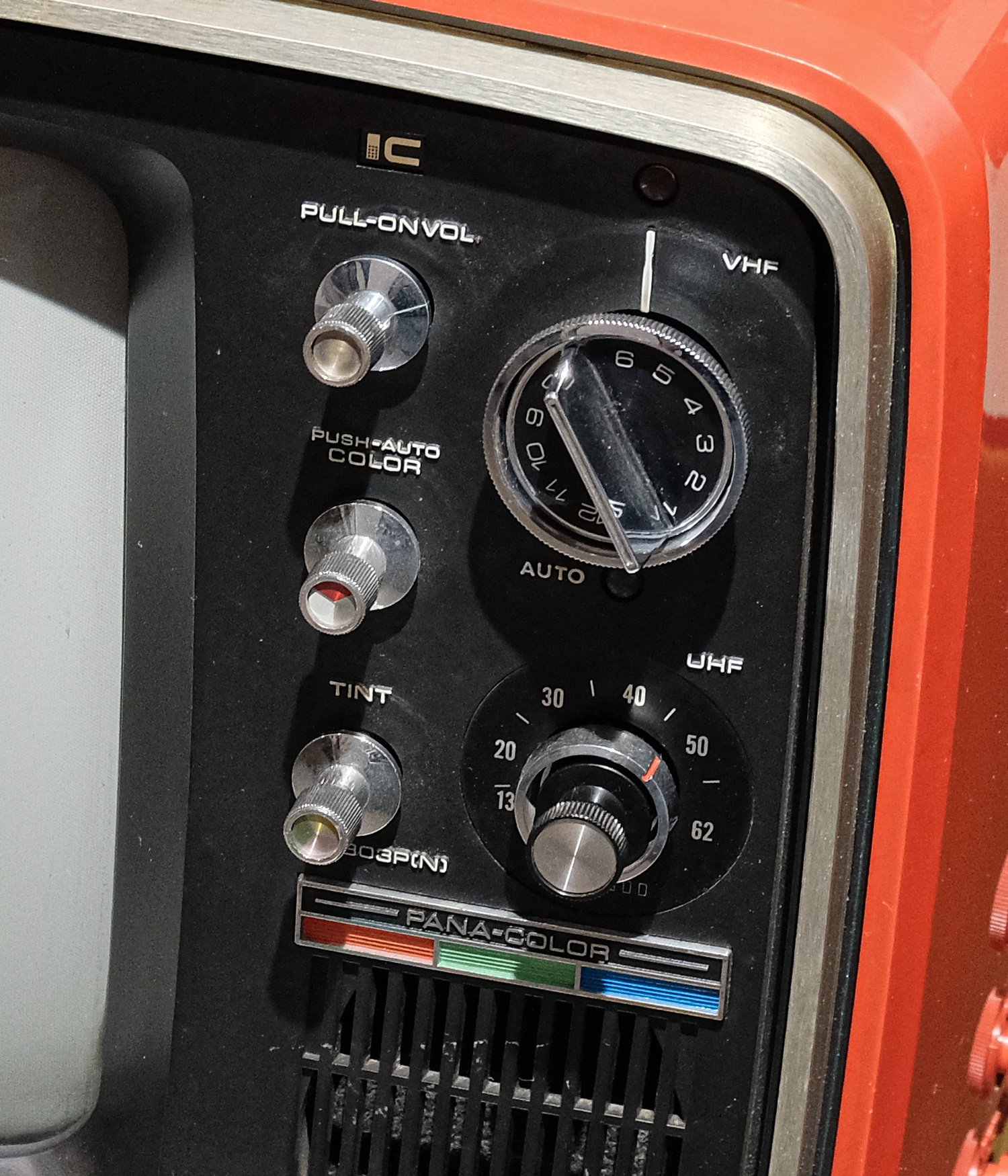
Controls on a National Pana-Color television set including a "Tint" adjustment.

A tint control (sometimes labelled as hue) is provided on some color television sets- primarily those designed for the NTSC broadcast standard- in order to compensate for reception errors and other issues with NTSC that can cause hue shifts and inaccurate color display.

As the PAL and SECAM broadcast systems were designed to overcome this problem, TV sets sold in countries that use them generally neither require nor traditionally include the tint control.

== Usage and effect ==
The tint control is normally set by sight to create satisfactory skin tones in a picture. The range of adjustment typically allows these colors to be adjusted from a green to a magenta tint. Television sets produced in recent decades typically include a (sometimes non-defeatable) distortion of the color decoding spectrum, to minimize the visual effects of phase error and lessen the need to adjust the tint control.

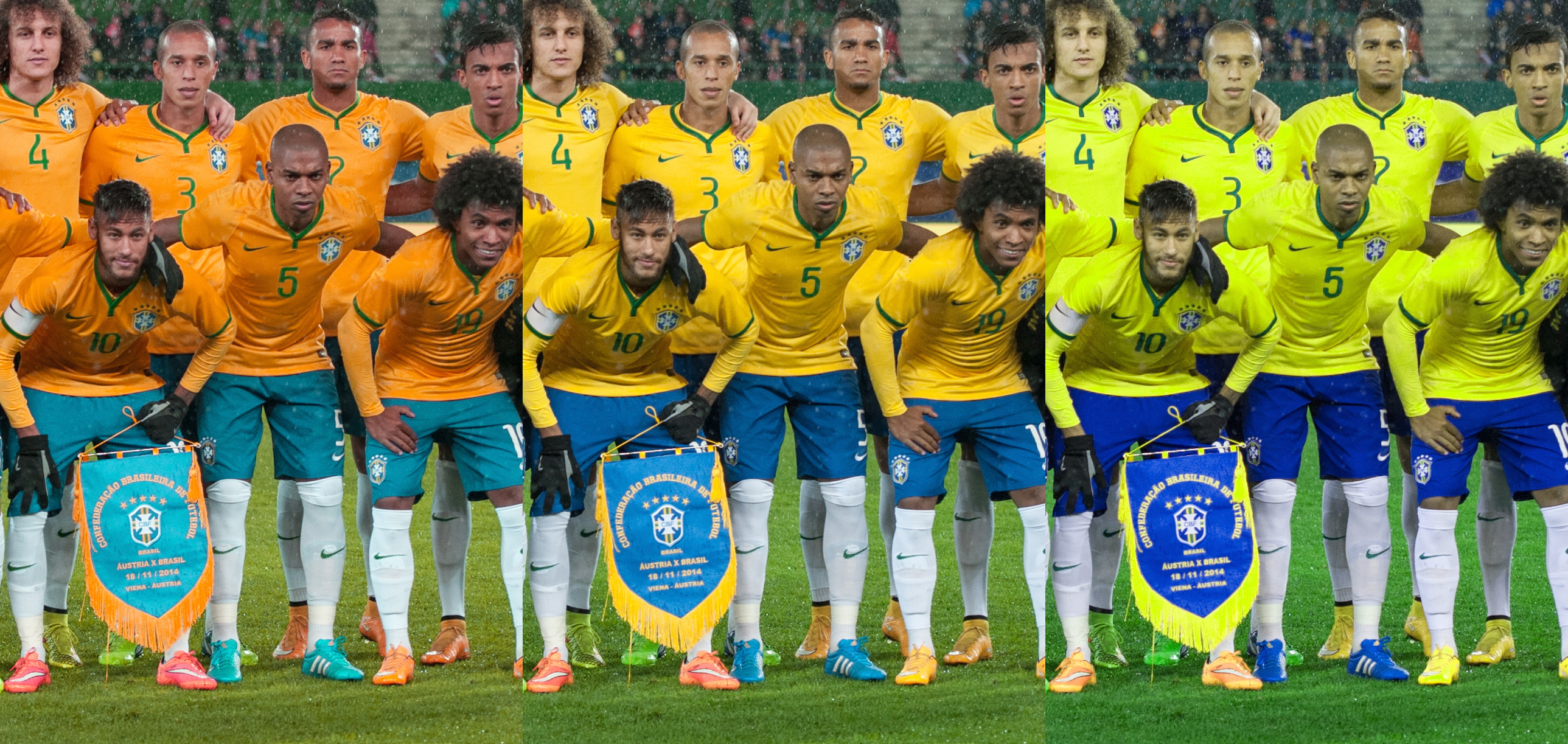
An approximate simulation of the effects of hue shift on a skin tones and other colours.

On broadcast equipment, such as timebase correctors and studio monitors, this control is typically marked "phase," as it adjusts the phase of the color signal with respect to the color burst signal.

The tint/hue adjustment only affects the hue of displayed colors, and is distinct from the "color" control (for color saturation adjustment) and from the color balance or color temperature adjustments common in newer sets.

== Technical background ==
Because the NTSC color standard relies on the absolute phase of the color information, color errors occur when the phase of the video signal is altered between source and receiver, or due to non linearities in electronics.

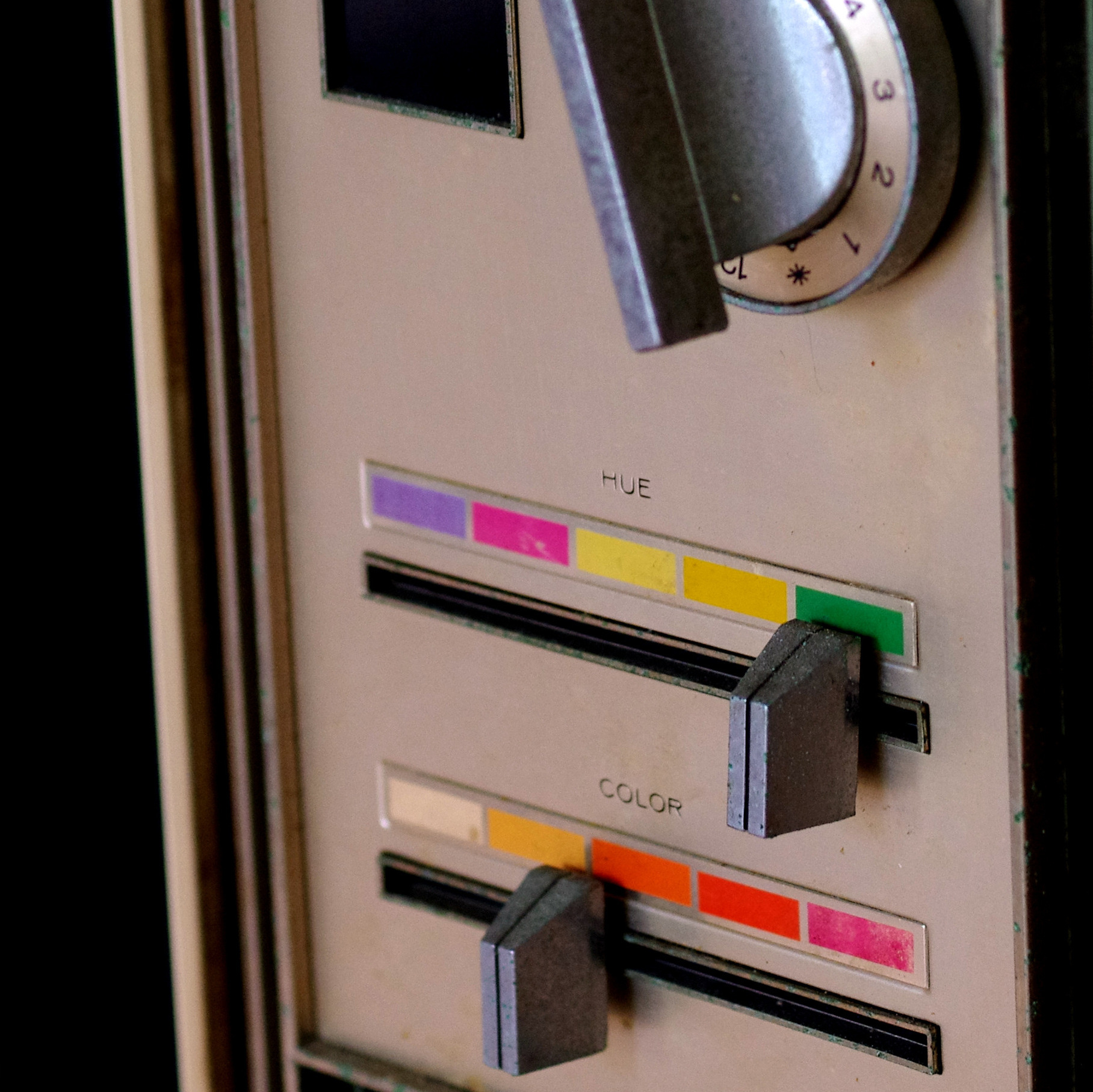
Controls on a Toshiba "Uni Color" television set featuring a "Hue" setting.

To correct for phase errors, a control lablled either "tint" or "hue" is provided on NTSC television sets, which allows the user to manually adjust the phase relationship between the color information in the video and the reference for decoding the color information, known as the "color burst", so that correct colors may be displayed.

=== Omission from PAL and SECAM equipment ===
Since the problem of phase errors in the real world became well known after the introduction of NTSC, the later PAL and SECAM color television standards attempted to correct for them, generally obviating the need for tint/hue controls.

PAL uses the same color modulation scheme as NTSC but averages the received color information over adjacent scan lines, resulting in reduced color detail but canceling out small to moderate phase errors. (Severe phase errors result in picture grain and loss of color saturation in the PAL scheme.)

SECAM uses a different modulation scheme that does not rely on the phase of the color signal. Because of this the amplitude of the color signal (color saturation) is unaffected as well. Because SECAM only broadcasts half the color information on each line, the color resolution is halved just like in the PAL system.

As a result, most TV sets designed for these later standards lack tint controls, as PAL and SECAM are not supposed to experience the problems a tint control would correct. (This leaves the viewer unable to correct for color errors originating at the transmission site, however.)

Multistandard sets have tint controls for NTSC viewing, but the controls are inoperative when watching PAL or SECAM signals.
