= Noise (video) =

Display on TV and radios due to causes such as there being no signal

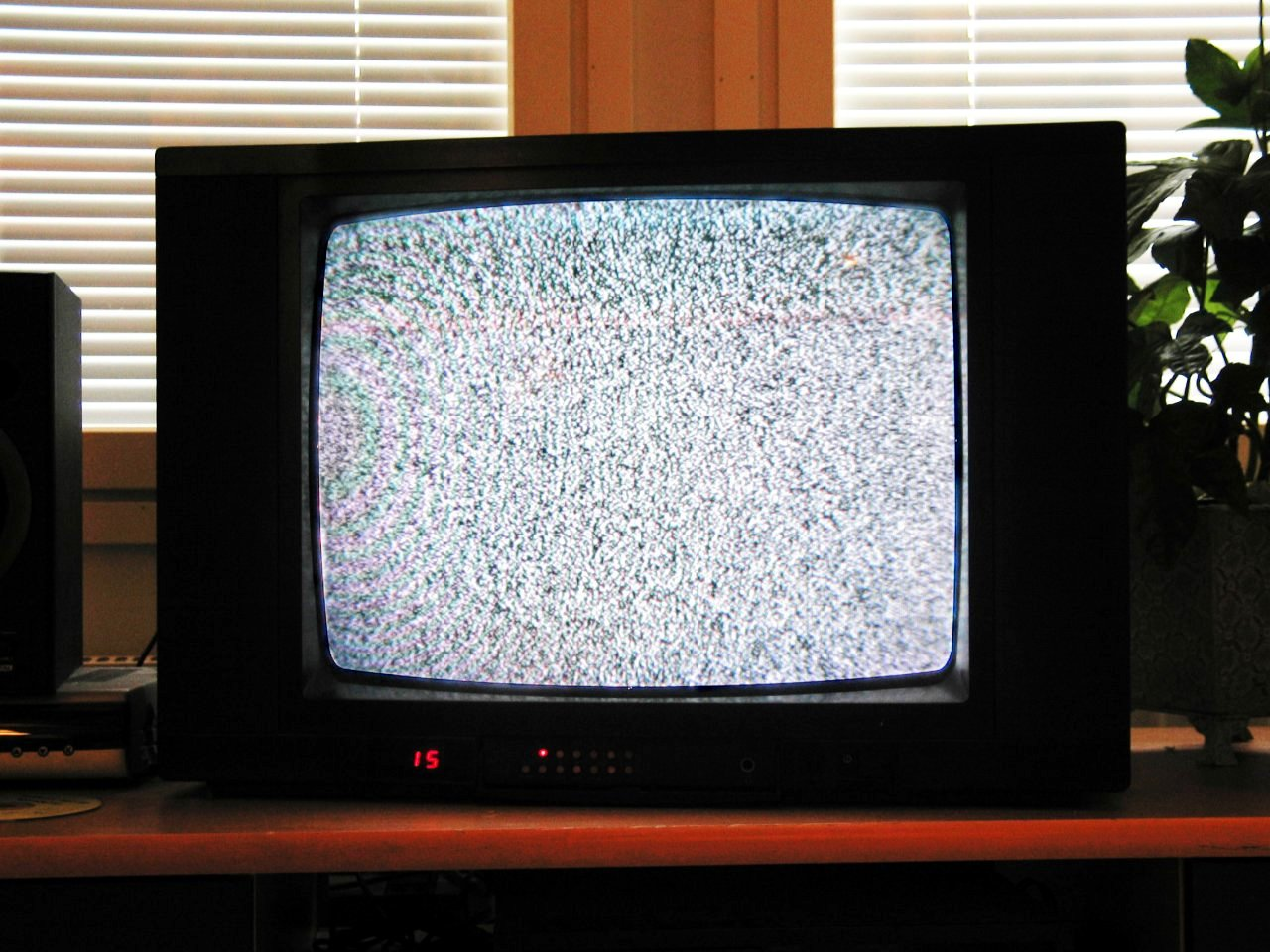
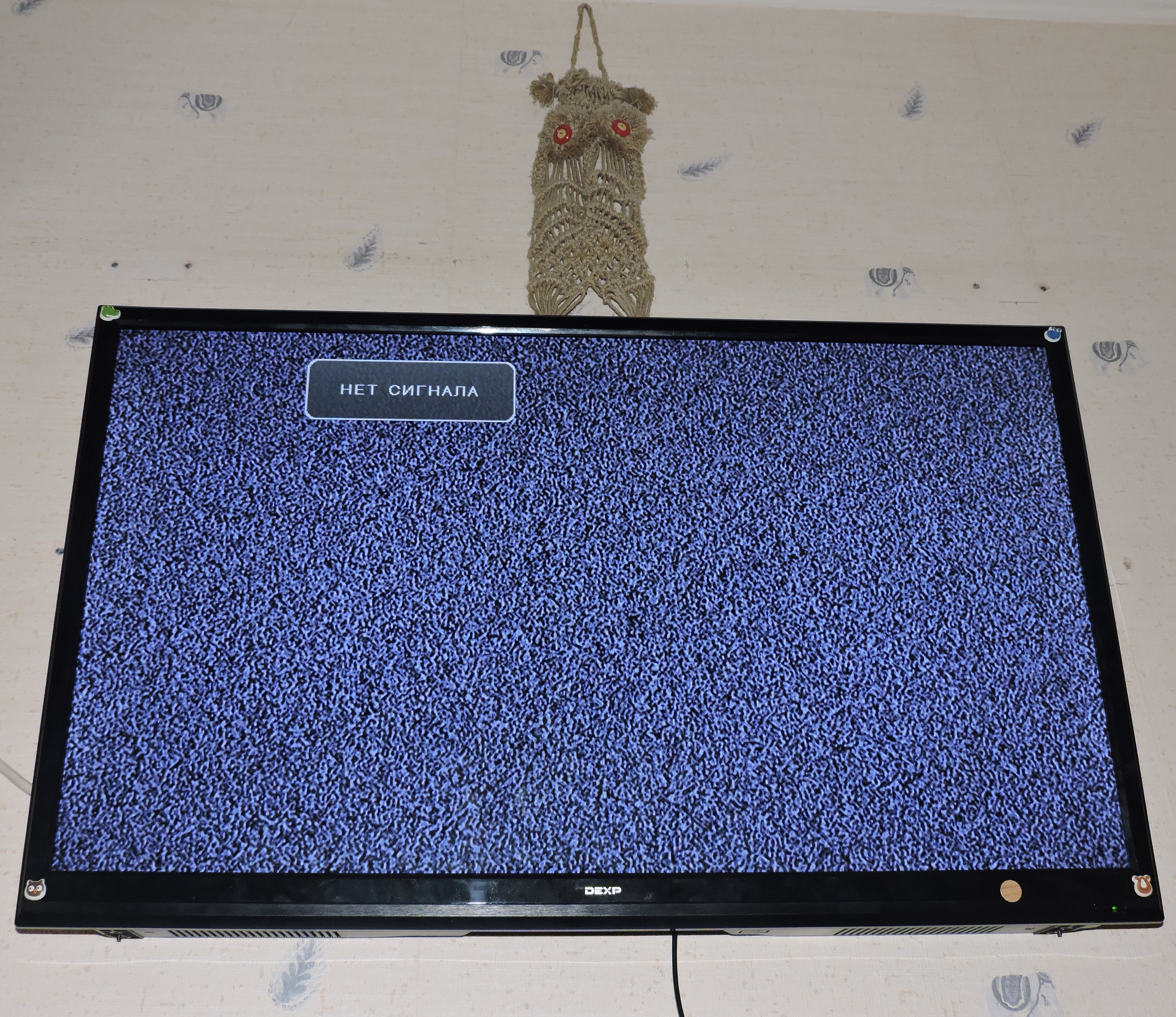
Noise in a CRT television (top) and flat screen television (bottom)

Noise, static or snow screen captured from a blank VHS tape

Noise, commonly known as static, static noise, or snow, in analog video, CRTs and television, is a random dot pixel pattern of static displayed when no transmission signal is obtained by the antenna receiver of television sets and other display devices.

== Description ==
The random pixel pattern superimposed on the picture or the television screen, being visible as a random flicker of "dots", "snow", "fuzzy zig-zags" or etc. in some television sets, is the result of electronic noise and radiated electromagnetic noise accidentally picked up by the antenna like air or cable. This effect is most commonly seen with analog TV sets, blank VHS tapes, or other display devices.

There are many sources of electromagnetic noise which cause the characteristic display patterns of static. Atmospheric sources of noise are the most ubiquitous, and include electromagnetic signals prompted by cosmic microwave background radiation, or more localized radio wave noise from nearby electronic devices.

The display device itself is also a source of noise, partly due to thermal noise produced by the inner electronics. Most of this noise comes from the first transistor the antenna is attached to.

== Names ==
UK viewers used to see "snow" on black after sign-off, instead of "bugs" on white, a purely technical artifact due to old 405-line British senders using positive rather than the negative video modulation used in Canada, the US, and (currently) the UK as well. Since one impression of the "snow" is of fast-flickering black bugs on a white background, the phenomenon is often called myrornas krig in Swedish, myrekrig in Danish, hangyák háborúja in Hungarian, Ameisenkrieg in German, and semut bertengkar in Indonesian, which all translate to 'war of the ants'.

It is also known as ekran karıncalanması in Turkish, meaning 'ants on the screen', hangyafoci 'ant football' in Hungarian, and purici 'fleas' in Romanian. In French however, this phenomenon is mostly called neige 'snow', just like in Dutch, where it is called sneeuw. In Portugal, it's called formigueiro 'anthill' or chuva that means ‘rain’.

In Italy this video noise is called sale e pepe 'salt and pepper'. In Argentine Spanish it's called lluvia 'rain', maybe related to the accompanying rustling sound. Similarly, this noise is called suna-arashi 'sand storm' in Japanese, referring to the natural phenomenon. In Brazilian Portuguese it's called chiado 'wheezing', referring to the noise made by Brazilian pressure cookers.

== Astronomical component ==
Because analog television uses radio waves to carry information, some of the white noise is the television receiving microwaves from the cosmic microwave background, an important trace of the Big Bang. NASA describes, "Turn your television to an 'in between' channel, and part of the static you will see is the afterglow of the big bang." This is also true for radio. When it is adjusted to a frequency that is between stations, part of the sound heard is remnant radiation from the Big Bang from around 13.7 billion years ago.

== See also ==
- Interference (wave propagation)
- Film grain
- Image noise
