= Peep search =

Video search feature

BetaSkipScan is a feature available on many videocassette recorders and most camcorders, whereby the unit can show you what is on the tape during rewind and fast forward operations. For this feature to work seamlessly, the tape must be fully laced up (wrapped around the video heads) during rewind and fast-forward operation, which is not usually supported on VHS decks and therefore makes VHS almost the only video tape format where peep search is not usually available.

To make a distinction between peep search and normal picture search, consider the following operations:

Picture Search (or cue and review):

- During tape playback, the Fast Forward or Rewind button is pressed. Depending on the model of machine, this button press may be momentary or have to be held. The picture can be viewed at high speed. When the button is released, or when Play is pressed again (depending on model), the video tape will again play at normal speed.

Peep Search:

- During tape fast forward or rewind, the same function is selected again with the Fast Forward or Rewind button. Now the machine instantly displays a high speed image from the tape. Upon releasing the button, the machine reverts to the fast forward or rewind function.

On some models of equipment, the peep search is carried out at the full rewind or fast forward speed, but most slow the tape down to the picture search speed and actually perform a picture search operation.

Peep Search is available with all of the following video tape formats:

- Video8/Hi8
- Digital8
- Betamax, though not implemented by Sanyo decks, most of which returned the tape to the cassette for high speed winding. Sony called their mode "BetaSkipScan".
- MiniDV, almost all miniDV equipment supports this feature, the notable exception being some JVC camcorders.
- MicroMV

The following formats generally or always unlace during rewind and fast-forward operations and so are unable to carry out this function:

- VHS/SVHS though a few models attempt to emulate the functionality, mostly Sony
- V2000

The following formats remain laced during rewind and fast-forward operations but the mechanisms did not allow for this feature:

- N1500/N1700

The peep search function may go under differing names, or no name at all, with some manufacturers. Many manufacturers' instruction manuals make no mention of this feature, even when it is installed. The name was first used by Canon.
