= SECAM =

French analog color television system

Analog television encoding systems by nation (at time of digital switchover, where applicable): NTSC SECAM PAL No info

SECAM, also written SÉCAM (French pronunciation: [sekam], Séquentiel couleur à mémoire, French for sequential colour system with memory), is an analogue colour television system that was used in France, Russia, and some other countries or territories of Europe and Africa. It was one of three major analog colour television standards, the others being PAL and NTSC. Similar to PAL, a SECAM picture is made up of 625 interlaced lines and displayed at a rate of 25 frames per second (except SECAM-M). However, because of how SECAM processes colour information, it is not compatible with the PAL video format standard. SECAM video is composite video; the luminance (luma, monochrome image) and chrominance (chroma, colour applied to the monochrome image) are transmitted together as one signal.

All the countries using SECAM have either converted to Digital Video Broadcasting (DVB), the new pan-European standard for digital television, or are currently in the process of conversion. SECAM remained a major standard into the 2000s.

== History ==
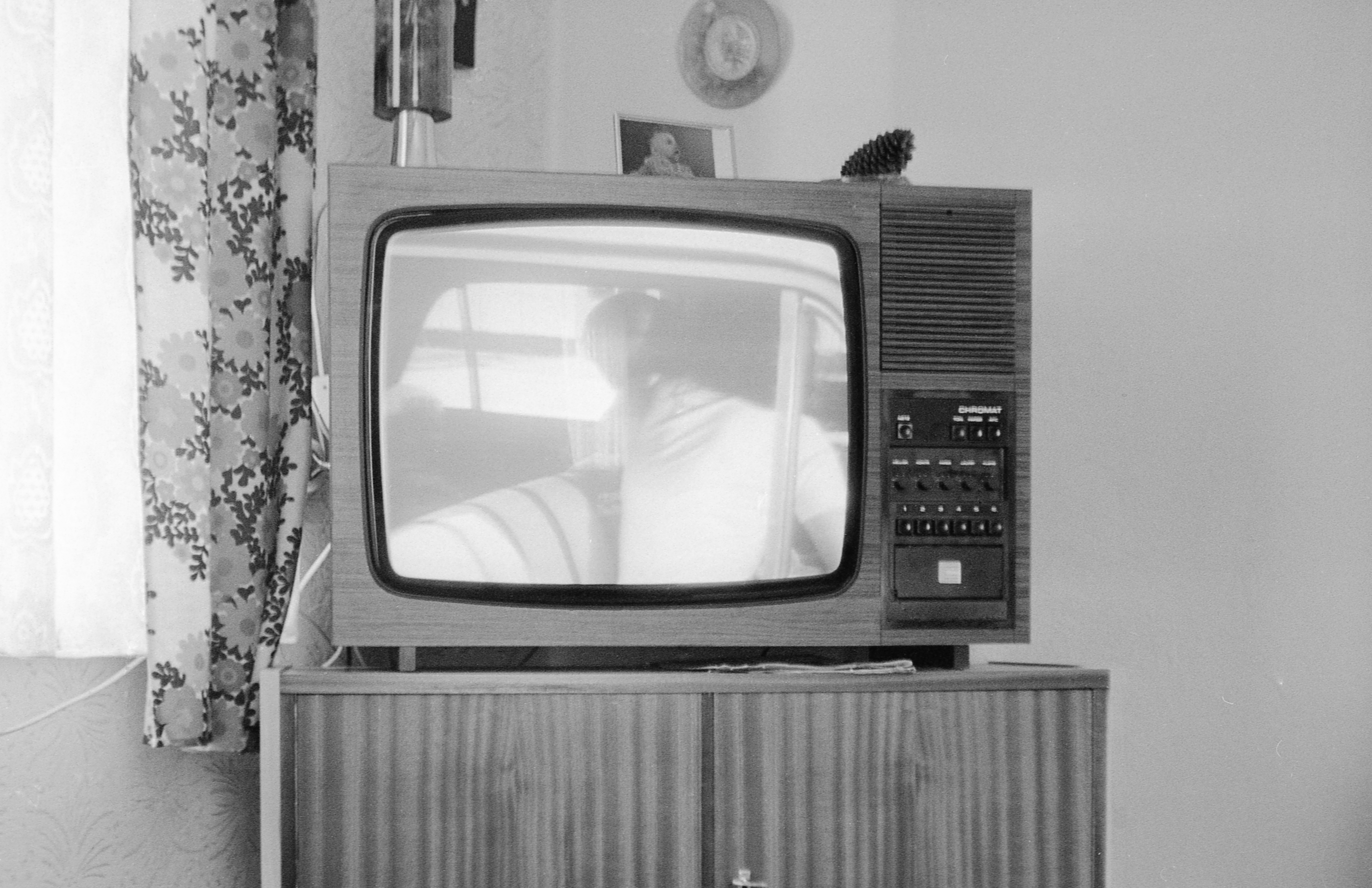
Chromat 2062, East German–produced dual-standard PAL/SECAM TV set

=== Invention ===
Development of SECAM predates PAL, and began in 1956 by a team led by Henri de France working at Compagnie Française de Télévision (later bought by Thomson, now Technicolor). NTSC was considered undesirable in Europe because of its tint problem, requiring an additional control, which SECAM (and PAL) solved.

Some have argued that the primary motivation for the development of SECAM in France was to protect French television equipment manufacturers. However, incompatibility had started with the earlier unusual decision to adopt positive video modulation for 819-line French broadcast signals (only the UK's 405-line was similar; widely adopted 525- and 625-line systems used negative video).

The first proposed system was called SECAM I in 1961, followed by other studies to improve compatibility and image quality, but it was too soon for a wide introduction. A version of SECAM for the French 819-line television standard was devised and tested, but never introduced.

Following a pan-European agreement to introduce colour TV only on 625-line broadcasts, France had to switch to that system, which happened in 1963 with the introduction of "la deuxième chaîne ORTF" France 2, the second national TV network.

Further improvements during 1963 and 1964 to the standard were called SECAM II and SECAM III, with the latter being presented at the 1965 CCIR General Assembly in Vienna, and adopted by France and the Soviet Union.

Soviet technicians were involved in a separate development of the standard, creating an incompatible variant called NIIR or SECAM IV, which was not deployed. The team was working in Moscow's Telecentrum. The NIIR designation comes from the name of the Nautchno-Issledovatelskiy Institut Radio (NIIR, rus. Научно-Исследовательский Институт Радио), a Soviet research institute involved in the studies. Two standards were developed: Non-linear NIIR, in which a process analogous to gamma correction is used, and Linear NIIR or SECAM IV that omits this process. SECAM IV was proposed by France and USSR at the 1966 Oslo CCIR conference and demonstrated in London.

Further improvements were SECAM III A, followed by SECAM III B, the system adopted for general use in 1967.

=== Implementation ===
Tested until 1963 on the second French national network "la deuxième chaîne ORTF", the SECAM standard was adopted in France and launched on 1 October 1967, now called France 2. A group of four suited men—a presenter (Georges Gorse, Minister of Information) and three contributors to the system's development—were shown standing in a studio. Following a count from 10, at 2:15 pm the black-and-white image switched to colour; the presenter then declared "Et voici la couleur !" (fr: And here is colour!) In the same year of 1967, CLT of Lebanon became the third television station in the world, after RTF Télévision 2 in France and the Soviet Central Television in the Soviet Union, to broadcast in colour utilizing the French SECAM technology.

The first colour television sets cost 5000 French new francs (the change to new franc occurred in 1960; see francs for more details). At that time a pocket book costed roughly 1 NF.

Colour TV was not very popular initially; only about 1500 people watched the inaugural program in colour. A year later in 1968, only 200,000 sets had been sold of an expected million. This pattern was similar to the earlier slow build-up of colour television popularity in the US.

In March 1969, East Germany decided to adopt SECAM III B. The adoption of SECAM in Eastern Europe has been attributed to Cold War political machinations. According to this explanation, East German political authorities were well aware of West German television's popularity and adopted SECAM rather than the PAL encoding used in West Germany. This did not hinder mutual reception in black and white, because the underlying TV standards remained essentially the same in both parts of Germany. However, East Germans responded by buying PAL decoders for their SECAM sets. Eventually, the government in East Berlin stopped paying attention to so-called "Republikflucht via Fernsehen", or "defection via television". Later East German-produced TV sets, such as the RFT Chromat, even included a dual-standard PAL/SECAM decoder as an option.

Another explanation for the Eastern European adoption of SECAM, led by the Soviet Union, is that the Russians had extremely long distribution lines between broadcasting stations and transmitters. Long co-axial cables or microwave links can cause amplitude and phase variations, which do not affect SECAM signals.

Other countries, notably the United Kingdom and Italy, briefly experimented with SECAM before opting for PAL. SECAM was adopted by former French and Belgian colonies in Africa, as well as Greece, Cyprus, and Eastern Bloc countries (except for Romania), and some Middle Eastern countries.

European efforts during the 1980–90s toward the creation of a unified analogue standard, resulting in the MAC standards, still used the sequential colour transmission idea of SECAM, with only one of time-compressed U and V components being transmitted on a given line. The D2-MAC standard enjoyed some short real market deployment, particularly in northern European countries. To some extent, this idea is still present in 4:2:0 digital sampling format, which is used by most digital video media available to the public. In this case, however, colour resolution is halved in both horizontal and vertical directions thus yielding a more symmetrical behavior.

=== Decline ===
With the fall of communism and following a period when multi-standard TV sets became common in the early 2000s, many Central and Eastern European countries decided to switch to the West German-developed PAL system. Yet SECAM remained in use in Russia, Belarus, and the French-speaking African countries. In the late 2000s, SECAM started a process of being phased out and replaced by DVB.

Unlike some other manufacturers, the company where SECAM was invented, Technicolor (known as Thomson until 2010), still sold television sets worldwide under different brands until the company sold its Trademark Licensing operations in 2022; this may be due in part to the legacy of SECAM. Thomson bought the company that developed PAL, Telefunken, and even co-owned the RCA brand – RCA being the creator of NTSC. Thomson also co-authored the ATSC standards which are used for American high-definition television.

== Design ==
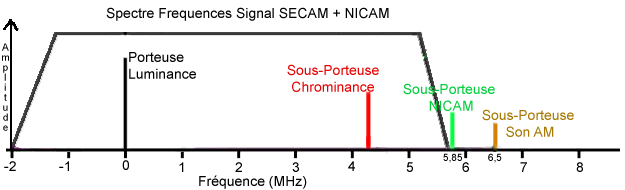
Spectrum of a SECAM broadcast, with colour (red) and sound (green, yellow) sub-carrier frequencies

Just as with the other colour standards adopted for broadcast usage over the world, SECAM is a standard that permits existing monochrome television receivers predating its introduction to continue to be operated as monochrome televisions. Because of this compatibility requirement, colour standards added a second signal to the basic monochrome signal, which carries the colour information. The black-and-white information is called the luminance or $Y$ for short, and the colour information is called chrominance or $C$ for short. Monochrome television receivers only display luminance, while colour receivers process both signals. The YDbDr colour space is used to encode the mentioned $Y$ (luminance) and $D_BD_R$ (red and blue colour difference signals that make up chrominance) components.

Additionally, for compatibility, it is required to use no more bandwidth than the monochrome signal alone; the colour signal has to be somehow inserted into the monochrome signal, without disturbing it. This insertion is possible because the bandwidth of the monochrome TV signal is generally not fully utilized; the high-frequency portions of the signal, corresponding to fine details in the image, were often not recorded by contemporary video equipment, or not visible on consumer televisions anyway, especially after transmission. This section of the spectrum was thus used to carry colour information, at the cost of reducing the possible resolution.

European monochrome standards were not compatible when SECAM was first being considered. France had introduced an 819-line system that used 14 MHz of bandwidth (System E), much more than the 5 MHz standard used in the UK (System A) or the 6 MHz in the US (System M). The closest thing to a standard in Europe at the time was the 8 MHz 625-line system (System D), which had originated Germany and the Soviet Union and quickly became one of the most used systems. An effort to harmonize European broadcasts on the 625-line system started in the 1950s and was first implemented in Ireland in 1962 (System I).

SECAM thus had the added issue of having to be compatible both with their existing 819-line system as well as their future broadcasts on the 625-line system. As the latter used much less bandwidth, it was this standard that defined the amount of colour information that could be carried. In the 8 MHz standard, the signal is split into two parts, the video signal, and the audio signal, each with its own carrier frequency. For any given channel, one carrier is located 1.25 MHz above the channel's listed frequency and indicates the location of the luminance portion of the signal. A second carrier is located 6 MHz above the luma carrier, indicating the center of the audio signal.

To add colour to the signal, SECAM adds another carrier located 4.4336... MHz above the luma carrier. The chroma signal is centered on this carrier, overlapping the upper part of the luma frequency range. Because the information of most scan lines differ little from their immediate neighbors, both luma and chroma signals are close to being periodic on the horizontal scan frequency, and thus their power spectra tends to be concentrated on multiples of such frequency. The specific colour carrier frequency of SECAM results from carefully choosing it so that the higher-powered harmonics of the modulated chroma and luma signals are apart from each other and from the sound carrier, thereby minimizing crosstalk between the three signals.

The colour space perceived by humans is three-dimensional because of the nature of their retinas, which include specific detectors for red, green and blue light. So in addition to luminance, which is already carried by the existing monochrome signal, colour requires sending two additional signals. The human retina is more sensitive to green light than to red (3:1) or blue (9:1) light. Because of this, the red ($R$) and blue ($B$) signals are usually chosen to be sent along luma but with comparably less resolution, to be able to save bandwidth while impacting the perceived image quality the least. (Also, the green signal is on average more closely correlated to luma, making them a poor choice of signal to send separately). To minimize crosstalk with luma and increase compatibility with existing monochrome TV sets, the $R$ and $B$ signals are usually sent as differences from luma ($Y$): $R-Y$ and $B-Y$. This way, for an image that contains little colour, its colour difference signals tend to zero and its colour-encoded signal converges to its equivalent monochrome signal.

=== Colourimetry ===
SECAM colourimetry was similar to PAL, as defined by the ITU on REC-BT.470. Yet the same document indicates that for existing (at the time of revision, 1998) SECAM sets, the following parameters (similar to the original 1953 colour NTSC specification) could be allowed:

SECAM colourimetry
| Standard | White point | | CCT | Primary colors (CIE 1931 xy) | | | | | | Display gamma EOTF |
| Standard | x | y | k | R_{x} | R_{y} | G_{x} | G_{y} | B_{x} | B_{y} | Display gamma EOTF |
|---|---|---|---|---|---|---|---|---|---|---|
| EBU 3213-E, ITU-R BT.470/601 (B/G) | 0.3127 | 0.3290 | 6500 (D65) | 0.64 | 0.33 | 0.29 | 0.60 | 0.15 | 0.06 | 2.8 |
| ITU-R BT.470-6 (provisional) | 0.31 | 0.316 | 6774 (C) | 0.67 | 0.33 | 0.21 | 0.71 | 0.14 | 0.08 | 2.8 |

The assumed display gamma was also defined as 2.8.

Luma ($E'{\scriptstyle\text{Y}}$) is derived from red, green, and blue ($E'{\scriptstyle\text{R}}, E'{\scriptstyle\text{G}}, E'{\scriptstyle\text{B}}$) gamma pre-corrected primary signals:

- $E'{\scriptstyle\text{Y}}= 0.299E'{\scriptstyle\text{R}} + 0.587E'{\scriptstyle\text{G}} + 0.114E'{\scriptstyle\text{B}}$

$D'{\scriptstyle\text{R}}$ and $D'{\scriptstyle\text{B}}$ are red and blue colour difference signals, used to calculate chrominance:

- $D'{\scriptstyle\text{R}}=-1.902(E'{\scriptstyle\text{R}}-E'{\scriptstyle\text{Y}})$
- $D'{\scriptstyle\text{B}} = +1.505(E'{\scriptstyle\text{B}}-E'{\scriptstyle\text{Y}})$

=== Comparison to PAL and NTSC ===
SECAM differs significantly from the other colour systems by the way the colour difference signals are carried. In NTSC and PAL, each line carries colour difference signals encoded using quadrature amplitude modulation (QAM). To demodulate such a signal, knowledge of the phase of the carrier signal is needed. This information is sent along the video signal at the start of every scan line in the form of a short burst of the colour carrier itself, called a "colourburst". A phase error during QAM demodulation produces crosstalk between the colour difference signals. On NTSC this creates Hue and Saturation errors, manually corrected for with a "tint" control on the receiving TV set; while PAL only suffers from Saturation errors. SECAM is free of this problem.

SECAM uses frequency modulation (FM) to encode chrominance information on the colour carrier, which does not require knowledge of the carrier phase to demodulate. However, the simple FM scheme used allows the transmission of only one signal, not the two required for colour. To address this, SECAM broadcasts $R-Y$ and $B-Y$ separately on alternating scan lines. To produce full colour, the colour information on one scan line is briefly stored in an analogue delay line adjusted so the signal exits the delay at the precise start of the next line. This allows the television to combine the $R-Y$ signal transmitted on one line with the $B-Y$ on the next and thereby produce a full colour gamut on every line. Because SECAM transmits only one chrominance component at a time, it is free of the colour artifacts ("dot crawl") present in NTSC and PAL that result from the combined transmission of colour difference signals.

This means that the vertical colour resolution of a field is halved compared to NTSC. However, the colour signals of all colour TV systems of the time were encoded in a narrower band than their luma signals, so colour information had lower horizontal resolution compared to luma in all systems. This matches the human retina, which has higher luminance resolution than colour resolution. On SECAM, the loss of vertical colour resolution makes the colour resolution closer to uniform in both axes and has little visual effect. The idea of reducing the vertical colour resolution comes from Henri de France, who observed that colour information is approximately identical for two successive lines. Because the colour information was designed to be a cheap, backward-compatible addition to the monochrome signal, the colour signal has a lower bandwidth than the luminance signal, and hence lower horizontal resolution. Fortunately, the human visual system is similar in design: it perceives changes in luminance at a higher resolution than changes in chrominance, so this asymmetry has minimal visual impact. It was therefore also logical to reduce the vertical colour resolution. A similar paradox applies to the vertical resolution in television in general: reducing the bandwidth of the video signal will preserve the vertical resolution, even if the image loses sharpness and is smudged in the horizontal direction. Hence, video could be sharper vertically than horizontally. Additionally, transmitting an image with too much vertical detail will cause annoying flicker on interlaced television screens, as small details will only appear on a single line (in one of the two interlaced fields), and hence be refreshed at half the frequency. (This is a consequence of interlaced scanning that is obviated by progressive scan.) Computer-generated text and inserts have to be carefully low-pass filtered to prevent this.

The colour difference signals in SECAM are calculated in the YDbDr colour space, which is a scaled version of the YUV colour space. This encoding is better suited to the transmission of only one signal at a time. FM modulation of the colour information allows SECAM to be completely free of the dot crawl problem commonly encountered with the other analog standards. SECAM transmissions are more robust over longer distances than NTSC or PAL. However, owing to their FM nature, the colour signal remains present, although at reduced amplitude, even in monochrome portions of the image, thus being subject to stronger cross colour even though colour crawl of the PAL type does not exist. Though most of the pattern is removed from PAL and NTSC-encoded signals with a comb filter (designed to segregate the two signals where the luma spectrum may overlap into the spectral space used by the chroma) by modern displays, some can still be left in certain parts of the picture. Such parts are usually sharp edges on the picture, sudden colour or brightness changes along the picture or certain repeating patterns, such as a checker board on clothing. FM SECAM is a continuous spectrum, so unlike PAL and NTSC even a perfect digital comb filter could not entirely separate SECAM luminance and colour signals.

=== Disadvantages ===
Unlike PAL or NTSC, analog SECAM programming cannot easily be edited in its native analog form. Because it uses frequency modulation, SECAM is not linear with respect to the input image (this is also what protects it against signal distortion), so electrically mixing two (synchronized) SECAM signals does not yield a valid SECAM signal, unlike with analog PAL or NTSC. For this reason, to mix two SECAM signals, they must be demodulated, the demodulated signals mixed, and are remodulated again. Hence, post-production is often done in PAL, or in component formats, with the result encoded or transcoded into SECAM at the point of transmission. Reducing the costs of running television stations is one reason for some countries' switchovers to PAL.

As of 2004, most TVs currently sold in SECAM countries supported both SECAM and PAL, and in then-newer models, typically composite video NTSC as well (though not usually broadcast NTSC, that is, they could accept a broadcast signal from an antenna). Although the older analog camcorders (VHS, VHS-C) were produced in SECAM versions, none of the 8 mm or Hi-band models (S-VHS, S-VHS-C, and Hi-8) recorded it directly.

Analog camcorders and VCRs of these standards sold in SECAM countries were internally PAL.. The result could be converted back to SECAM in some models; most people buying such expensive equipment would have a multistandard TV set and as such would not need a conversion.

Digital camcorders or DVD players (with the exception of some early models) do not accept or output a SECAM analog signal. However, this had become of dwindling importance by the time of their launch, as at that point most new consumer video equipment sold in Europe featured SCART connectors. Since these supported the transmission of analog RGB component video directly (without the need for colour encoding and decoding), this reduced the need for legacy PAL, SECAM, and NTSC colour sub carrier standard support.

In general, modern professional equipment is now all-digital, and uses component-based digital interconnects such as CCIR 601 to eliminate the need for any analog processing prior to the final modulation of the analog signal for broadcast.

However, as of 2004, large installed bases of analog professional equipment still existed, particularly in third world countries.

== Varieties ==
=== Broadcast systems L, B/G, D/K, H, K, M ===
There are six varieties of SECAM, according to each of the broadcast system it was used with:

- SECAM-L: Used only in France, Luxembourg (only RTL9 on channel 21 from Dudelange) and Télé Monte-Carlo transmitters in the south of France.
- SECAM-B/G: Used in parts of the Middle East, former East Germany, Greece, and Cyprus
- SECAM-D/K: Used in the Commonwealth of Independent States and most parts of Central and Eastern Europe (this is simply SECAM used with the D and K monochrome TV transmission standards) although most Central and Eastern European countries have now migrated to other systems.
- SECAM-H: Around 1983–1984 a new colour identification standard ("Line SECAM or SECAM-H") was introduced in order to make more space available inside the signal for adding teletext information (originally according to the Antiope standard). Identification bursts were made per-line (like in PAL) rather than per-picture. Very old SECAM TV sets might not be able to display colour for today's broadcasts, although sets manufactured after the mid-1970s should be able to receive either variant.
- SECAM-K: The standard used in France's overseas possessions (as well as African countries that were once ruled by France) was slightly different from the SECAM used in Metropolitan France. The SECAM standard used in Metropolitan France used the SECAM-L and a variant of the channel information for VHF channels 2–10. French overseas possessions and many French-speaking African countries use the SECAM-K^{1} standard and a mutually incompatible variant of the channel information for VHF channels 4-9 (not channels 2–10).
- SECAM-M: Between 1970 and 1991, SECAM-M was used in Cambodia, Laos, and Vietnam (Hanoi and other northern cities).

=== MESECAM (home recording) ===
MESECAM is a method of recording SECAM colour signals onto VHS or Betamax video tape. It should not be mistaken for a broadcast standard.

"Native" SECAM recording (marketing term: "SECAM-West") was devised for machines sold for the French (and adjacent countries) market. At a later stage, countries where both PAL and SECAM signals were available developed a cheap method of converting PAL video machines to record SECAM signals, using only the PAL recording circuitry. Although being a workaround, MESECAM is much more widespread than "native" SECAM. It has been the only method of recording SECAM signals to VHS in almost all countries that used SECAM, including the Middle East and all countries in Eastern Europe.

A tape produced by this method is not compatible with "native" SECAM tapes as produced by VCRs in the French market. It will play in black and white only, the colour is lost. Most VHS machines advertised as "SECAM capable" outside France can be expected to be of the MESECAM variety only.

==== Technical details ====
On VHS tapes, the luminance signal is recorded FM-encoded (on VHS with reduced bandwidth, on S-VHS with full bandwidth) but the PAL or NTSC chrominance signal is too sensitive to small changes in frequency caused by inevitable small variations in tape speed to be recorded directly. Instead, it is first shifted down to the lower frequency of 630 kHz, and the complex nature of the PAL or NTSC sub-carrier means that the down conversion must be done via heterodyning to ensure that information is not lost.

The SECAM sub-carriers, which consist of two simple FM signals at 4.41 MHz and 4.25 MHz, do not need this (actually simple) processing. The VHS specification for "native" SECAM recording specifies that they be divided by 4 on recording to give sub carriers of approximately 1.1 MHz and 1.06 MHz, and multiplied by 4 on playback. A true dual-standard PAL and SECAM video recorder therefore requires two colour processing circuits, adding to complexity and expense. Since some countries in the Middle East use PAL and others use SECAM, the region has adopted a shortcut, and uses the PAL mixer-downconverter approach for both PAL and SECAM, simplifying VCR design.

Many PAL VHS recorders have had their analog tuner modified in French-speaking western Switzerland (Switzerland used the PAL-B/G standard while the bordering France used SECAM-L). The original tuner in those PAL recorders allows only PAL-B/G reception. The Swiss importers added a circuit with a specific IC for the French SECAM-L standard, making the tuner multi-standard and allowing the VCR to record SECAM broadcasts in MESECAM. A stamp mentioning "PAL+SECAM" was added to these machines.

Video recorders like Panasonic NV-W1E (AG-W1-P for professional), AG-W3, NV-J700AM, Aiwa HV-MX100, HV-MX1U, Samsung SV-4000W and SV-7000W feature a digital standard conversion circuitry.

== Adoption ==
A legacy list of SECAM users in 1998 is available on Recommendation ITU-R BT.470-6 - Conventional Television Systems, Appendix 1 to Annex 1, and the list before many OIRT countries migrated to PAL can be found at CCIR Report 624-3 Characteristics of television systems, Annex I.

Below is an updated list of nations that currently authorize the use of the SECAM standard for television broadcasting. It is subject to ongoing changes as nations move to PAL and DVB-T. These migrations are listed separately.

SECAM users
- Benin
- Burkina Faso
- Burundi
- Central African Republic
- Chad
- Republic of the Congo
- Democratic Republic of the Congo
- Gabon
- Guinea
- Ivory Coast
- Kazakhstan
- Madagascar
- Mali
- Mauritania
- Niger
- Rwanda
- Russia (first two multiplex channels transitioned to DVB-T2 in 2019; full transition scheduled for 19 August 2025)
- Senegal
- Syria (Simulcast in PAL-G)
- Tajikistan
- Togo
- Turkmenistan

=== Migration to other standards ===
==== PAL ====
Europe

- Bulgaria (Migrated in 1994–1996)
- Czechoslovakia (Migrated in 1992–1994) (Note: As separate countries (Czech Republic and Slovakia) in 1993.)
- East Germany (Switchover on 31 December 1991, after German reunification in 1990)
- Estonia (Switchover ended in November 1999 with ETV and Kanal 2) (Note: TV3 went to PAL in 1998 and TV1 was in PAL from the beginning.)
- Georgia (country) (Migrated in 2000s)
- Greece (Migrated in 1992)
- Hungary (Migrated in 1995–1996)
- Latvia (Migrated in 1997–1999)
- Lithuania (Migrated in 2002)
- Poland (Migrated in 1993–1995)
- Ukraine (Migrated in 1992–1994, simulcast in SECAM until early 2010s)

Czech Republic, Slovakia, Hungary, and the Baltic countries also changed their underlying sound carrier standard on the UHF band from D/K to B/G which is used in most of Western Europe, to facilitate use of imported broadcast equipment, while leaving the D/K standard on VHF. This required viewers to purchase multistandard receivers though. The other countries mentioned kept their existing standards (B/G in the cases of East Germany and Greece, D/K for the rest).

Africa

- Egypt (for a few years before was simulcast) (Note: Ceased in 1992 in favour of PAL-B/G.)

Asia

- Afghanistan (Migrated in the 1990s)
- Armenia (Migrated in late 1980s)
- Azerbaijan (Migrated in 2001)
- Cambodia (Migrated in 1991–1992, from SECAM-M to PAL-B/G)
- Iran (Reverted in 1998 to PAL-B/G)
- Laos (Migrated in the 1990s from SECAM-M)
- North Korea (Migrated in 1993)
- Saudi Arabia (Simulcast in NTSC, SECAM, and PAL before switching to PAL entirely in the late 1990s or early 2000s)
- Vietnam (Brief simulcast in PAL) (Note: Migrated in the 1990s, from SECAM-M to PAL-D/K.)

==== DVB ====
| Country | Switched to | Switchover completed |
|---|---|---|
| France | DVB-T | 29 November 2011 |
| French Guiana | DVB-T | 29 November 2011 |
| French Polynesia | DVB-T | 20 September 2011 |
| Guadeloupe | DVB-T | 29 November 2011 |
| Kyrgyzstan | DVB-T2 | 2015 |
| Martinique | DVB-T | 29 November 2011 |
| Mauritius | DVB-T and DVB-T2 | 2013 |
| Mayotte | DVB-T | 29 November 2011 |
| Monaco | DVB-T | 24 May 2011 |
| Morocco | DVB-T | 17 June 2015 |
| New Caledonia | DVB-T | 27 September 2011 |
| Réunion | DVB-T | 25 October 2011 |
| Saint Barthélemy | DVB-T | 29 November 2011 |
| Saint Pierre and Miquelon | DVB-T | 27 September 2011 |
| Tunisia | DVB-T | 3 April 2015 |
| Uzbekistan | DVB-T and DVB-T2 | 2015 |
| Wallis and Futuna | DVB-T | 27 September 2011 |

== See also ==
- 576i – Standard-definition video mode
