= Multi-standard television =

Multi-standard television sets were made for use in the television industry, so that one TV set or monitor could show video content from other television systems. Multistandard is only used with analogue television. In digital television, there are different standards, like DVB, ISDB, and ATSC. However, digital multistandard television sets are not exist. Multistandard digital TV devices may be in the form of TV tuner cards.

Phillips produced a valve TV set that could receive most 625 lines and 819 line television systems. In the United Kingdom, there were quite a number of TV sets produced that were capable of receiving both monochrome 405 line and 625 line PAL-I broadcasts. These sets usually had a large relay or relays that would switch the circuits, through manual control.

== The USSR and PAL in SECAM countries ==
In the mid-1980s, the Soviet Union implemented a program, in which it would be mandatory for new colour TV sets sold to include PAL also, in view to migrating to PAL. That is why an Australian video tape will play in colour on a Russian TV set. Eventually it became the standard practice for all SECAM TV sets made to also accept PAL. This trend gradually propagated throughout SECAM countries, including France itself.

== NTSC playback in PAL countries ==
In order to be able to watch American video tapes, the people of Europe and Southeast Asia started to buy video recorders that would play back an NTSC video tape and convert the colour component of the video content to PAL, whilst leaving the number of lines the same, and the field rate, slightly slowed down in order to accommodate the exact 64 microsecond line length required for PAL.

Newer TV sets would automatically accommodate the 60 Hertz vertical scan rate, and older TV sets needed a manual adjustment of the vertical hold. DVD players give the option of converting the whole signal to PAL standards complete with 50 Hertz scan rate. The results given by a modern DVD player can be quite pleasing when playing back an NTSC DVD.

== PAL playback in NTSC countries ==
In the USA proper, the ability for an American TV set, or DVD player to play back a PAL DVD became widespread throughout the 2000s. By 2009 about 80% of DVD and TV setups in the United States could play a PAL DVD. So now a PAL DVD can be sold in the United States, without the need about issues with the DVD, converted into NTSC.
