= Video modulation =

Group of video-transmitting modulation modes

Video modulation is a strategy of transmitting video signal in the field of radio modulation and television technology. This strategy enables the video signal to be transmitted more efficiently through long distances. In general, video modulation means that a higher frequency carrier wave is modified according to the original video signal. In this way, carrier wave contains the information in the video signal. Then, the carrier will "carry" the information in the form of radio frequency (RF) signal. When carrier reaches its destination, the video signal is extracted from the carrier by decoding. In other words, the video signal is first combined with a higher frequency carrier wave so that carrier wave contains the information in video signal. The combined signal is called radio-frequency signal. At the end of this transmitting system, the RF signals stream from a light sensor and hence, the receivers can obtain the initial data in the original video signal.

There are many application of video modulation:

- Broadcasting music and speech
- Two way radio systems (a radio that can both transmit and receive)
- Aircraft band (radio communication in civil aviation)
- Computer modems (a device that modulates Wi-Fi)

These applications all utilized the efficiency of video modulation in order to minimize costs.

== Key concepts ==
There are some important concepts needed to be understood in order to fully comprehend the video modulation.

=== Circuit ===
Video signals are usually encoded into binary digit (0, 1) or seven digit pulse-code modulation (PCM), which is a method used to digitally represent original video signal. The video signal converted to binary digit PCM at the point of origin can be then transmitted over existing telephone cable or wire directly to the destination. If the distance between origin and destination is too long, a repeater is needed to receive the signal and retransmit it at higher power so that the signal can cover longer distances. The circuit designed for the transmission should gather as many advantages as possible in order to be efficient. In other words, the circuit should be built with high quality and reliability and with minimum cost. The most common cable used to build the circuit is the 51-pair cable. This type of cable is often utilized in house phone because of the low price and good functionality. Also, signals can be transmitted efficiently since the distance between two adjacent repeaters can be 6000 feet rather than only 3000 feet compared to other cable.

=== Coding ===
Coding is the process during which the video inputs are transferred into binary digit (0, 1) because digits can be much more easily transmitted. A crystal oscillator is used in coding. It is an electronic oscillator that uses the mechanical resonance of a vibrating crystal or piezoelectric material to create an electrical signal with a very precise frequency. Inside the crystal oscillator, there is usually a crystal or elastic material whose constituent atoms, molecules, or ions are in a regular order. For example, the quartz is often used in crystal oscillators due to its elasticity. After a crystal is accurately installed, electric field can be distorted by a change in the voltage due to an electrode near or on the crystal. This characteristic is called electrostriction or inverse piezoelectricity. When the video signals are inputted into the oscillators, the crystal with electrodes attaching to it starts to vibrate as a resonator. The crystal's piezoelectric property converts the mechanical vibrations into an oscillating voltage and then the voltage is picked up by the attached electrodes. Thus, the electric field is distorted due to the potential differences between the electrodes. Since the original video signal exists as a time-varying voltage on a wire, the distorted electric field is also time-varying. The changing electric field is converted into waveform, a signal in the shape/form of wave. Finally, the output signals are combined with a carrier wave and transferred into RF signals, then transmitted to the receiver.

=== Decoding ===
After the RF signals arrive the destination, the receiver cannot obtain the data directly from the RF signals because there are coded and multiplied RF signals existing at the same time. As for the multiple RF signals problem, an electric filter is used. The frequency of each RF signal is usually different from other RF signals. An electronic filter can select only one RF signal on the basis of its carrier frequency, while rejecting all other RF signals. One example of this operation is selecting a channel on a television receiver. With only one RF signal that passes through the electric filter, only the one corresponding video signal is received, with no interference from the other RF signals.

For the coded RF signals, a light sensor is utilized. Generally, a light sensor is a device that detects changes of light in quantities and provides a corresponding output. One application of light sensors is the compensated light sensor system. This system can control the level of light at a workplace. The ratio of the light at the light sensors to the level of controlled light at the workplace is maintained substantially constant as daylight entering the room varies. In decoding process, a light sensor is used to detect the RF signal and then output the decoded signal. In general, the RF signals steamed from electric filters are first converted from binary digit to octal digit (0, 1, 2, 3, 4, 5, 6, 7). The octal signals are then detected by the light sensors. The sensors respond by developing corresponding digital, electrical signals which are hence decoded to apprise the viewer of the transmitted message or are applied to external equipment such as a calculator, a computer, a hard copy machine or other devices appropriate for the particular occasion.

== Types of video modulation ==
The types of video modulation can be classified by the way that a carrier wave is combined with video signal. The video signal and carrier wave both exist in waveform and when the carrier wave "carries" the video signal, the shape of carrier wave is changed and the changed carrier wave is the RF signal. Hence, how the shape of carrier wave is changed is the key to classify the types of video modulation.

=== Amplitude modulation (AM) ===
Amplitude modulation works by varying the amplitude of the carrier wave according to the bent waveform of original video signal. In other words, when the carrier wave is combined with the video signal, frequency of the combined signal is the same as the frequency of the carrier wave while the amplitude is varied. The picture above can more directly explain how the shape is changed. In the combining process, if the video signal is at its peak (highest amplitude value), the amplitude of the varied carrier wave will be the highest and as for trough (lowest amplitude value), the amplitude of varied carrier wave will be the lowest. In other words, at the point in carrier wave that corresponds to the peak of video signal, the shape of wave will be most bulged and at the point corresponding to the trough, the shape will be most sunk. In fact, the change in amplitude of carrier wave is proportional to the amplitude of the video signal.

=== Frequency modulation (FM) ===
In frequency modulation, the carrier wave is combined with video signal by varying the instantaneous frequency of the wave (the frequency of wave at a particular point). (Compare with amplitude modulation, in which the amplitude of the carrier wave varies, while the frequency remains constant.) From the picture above, if the video signal is at its peak, the instantaneous frequency of carrier wave will increase and as for the trough, the instantaneous frequency will decrease. More visually, the carrier wave becomes densest at the point corresponding to the peak in video signal and thinnest at the point corresponding to the trough.

== Applications ==
Various types of video modulation can be applied in various areas due to their unique advantages and disadvantages.

=== Application of AM ===
- Radio or television (broadcasting)
- Aircraft band

AM is applied in these areas because video amplitude modulated signal can be easily coded and decoded since the change in amplitude of the carrier wave and the amplitude of original video signal is proportional. However, amplitude modulation is sensitive to noise and electromagnetic interference. Hence, the AM techniques are mainly utilized in less technical fields that tolerate noise and electromagnetic interference, such as broadcasting.

=== Application of FM ===
- Magnetic tape data storage
- VCR systems

FM is applied in these fields because it is less sensitive to the noise and electromagnetic interference and when the data is collected or the signal is recorded, it is really important to minimize the effects of outside interference, such as noise and electromagnetic interference.

== See also ==
TV systems

- NTSC and NTSC-J

Colour encoding systems

- PAL
- SECAM

Connectors

- SCART
