= Presentation slide =

Single page or image of a presentation

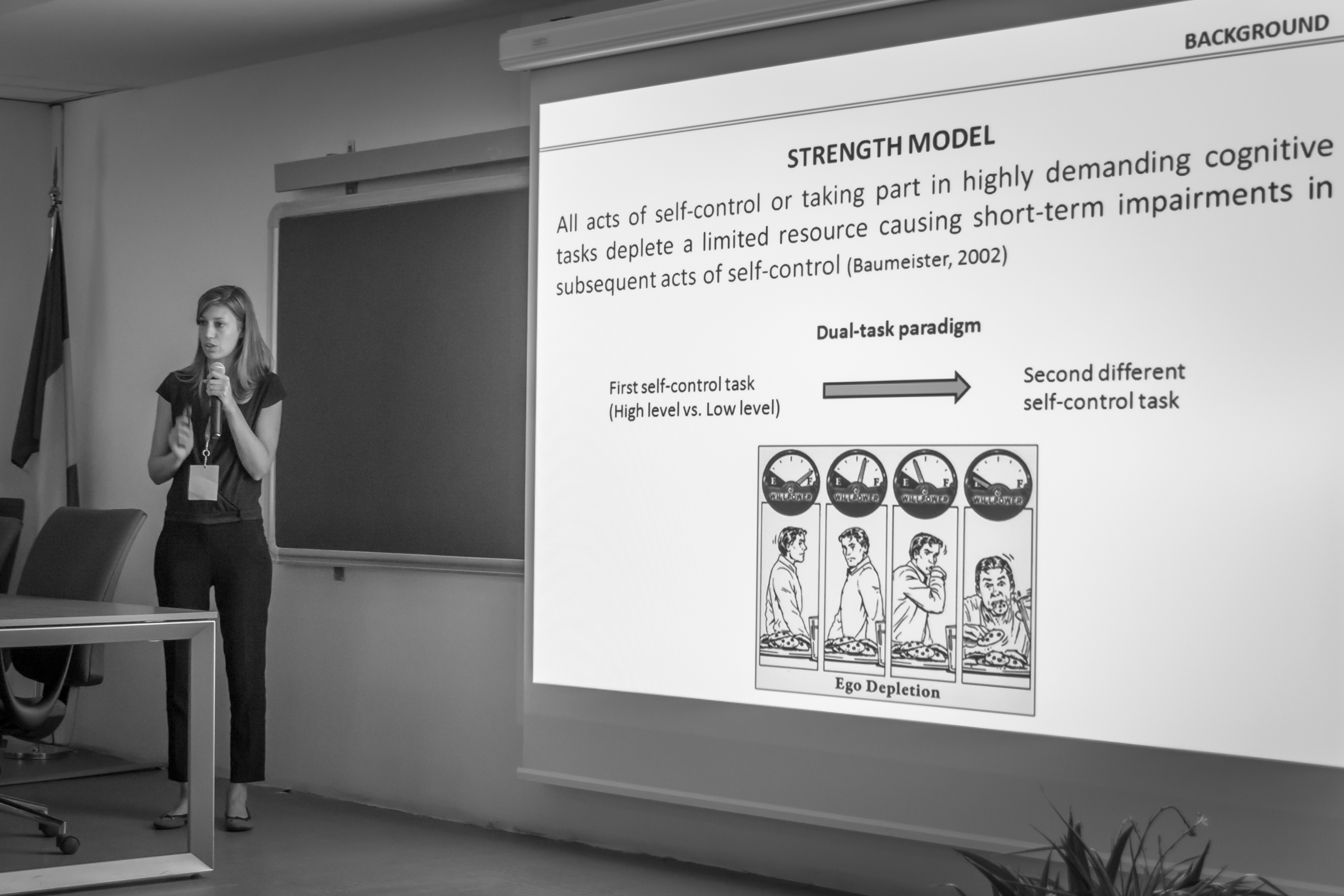
A woman delivering a presentation while referencing a slide

A slide is a single page of a presentation. A group of slides is called a slide deck. A slide show is an exposition of a series of slides or images in an electronic device or on a projection screen. Before personal computers, they were 35 mm slides viewed with a slide projector or transparencies viewed with an overhead projector.

In the digital age, a slide most commonly refers to a single page developed using a presentation program such as MS PowerPoint, Apple Keynote, Google Slides, Apache OpenOffice or LibreOffice. Some are created with document markup language, such as the LaTeX-class Beamer. Lecture notes in slide format are lecture slides, frequently downloadable by students in .ppt or .pdf format.

== Production software ==
By the 1980s, presentation software created slides, with companies offering their development and delivery as fast as the next day. Presentation slides can be created in many pieces of software such as Microsoft PowerPoint, Apple Keynote, LibreOffice Impress, Prezi, ClearSlide, Powtoon, GoAnimate, Snagit, Camtasia, CamStudio, SlideShare, and Reallusion.

Some software, like competitors PowToon and Vyond, produces slides with more animation. Others like CamStudio can be used to record the screen activity.

The most popular pieces of slide producing software are Microsoft PowerPoint, Prezi, Apple Keynote, Google Slides and ClearSlide.

- PowerPoint is currently the most popular slides presentation program. LibreOffice Impress is a FOSS alternative.
- Prezi was developed in 2009 by Peter Arvai, Peter Halácsy and Ádám Somlai-Fischer in Budapest and San Francisco. Today, Prezi has 40 million users internationally.
- Apple Keynote, updated for OS X El Capitan, works on Macs and some other Apple devices.
- ClearSlide is commonly used in marketing and sales organizations for presentations to customers.
- Google Slides was developed by Google at the same time as Google Docs and Sheets, in 2007. The tool allows live collaboration.

== Templates ==
Typically in a set of slides (a "deck"), all the slides will have a similar layout template, controlling such factors as margins and headings.

== Sharing websites ==
Some websites offer facilities to share slide presentations online.

SlideShare allows the user to share presentations publicly or privately. Slides can be uploaded in various ways, via email and through social media are the most common ways of sharing the slides.

AuthorSTREAM only allows the user to upload PowerPoint presentation slides. On this website users can give feedback by rating presentations and posting comments.

SlideBoom turns slide presentations into Adobe Flash so they can be viewed without slide presentation software.

SlideOnline allows the user to upload PowerPoint presentations and share them as a web page in any device or to embed them in WordPress as part of the posts comments.

Another way of sharing slides is by turning them into a video. PowerPoint allows users to export a presentation to video (.mp4 or .wmv).

== See also ==
- Reversal film - photographic slides produced from camera film & viewed with a slide projector
- Transparency (projection)
- Online video presentations
