= Nawmal =

Canadian digital-entertainment company

Technologies Nawmal Inc.
- Type: 3D animation website
- Founded: 2004; 22 years ago
- Headquarters: Montreal, Quebec, Canada
- Website: http://www.nawmal.com

Nawmal, formerly known as Xtranormal, is a web and desktop do-it-yourself animation software. It is produced by Technologies Nawmal Inc., formerly Nawmal Ltd., a Canadian digital entertainment company based in Montreal, Canada. Nawmal turns words from a script into an animated movie using text-to-speech and animation technologies.

== History ==
Logo of Xtranormal

Nawmal's predecessor, Xtranormal, was launched after four years of software development. It was established as a storyboarding tool for writers and film directors. The original intent was to allow users to create videos by choosing from a menu of pre-designed characters and sets, and scripting their own dialogue.

Xtranormal's State platform allowed casual users to create their own animated videos, and could be downloaded for free and run offline. At some point, State was replaced with a newer version of the animation software called Xtranormal Desktop (or, XD). Like State, XD was free to download from the Xtranormal website, but is no longer available after Xtranormal's shutdown. Xtranormal also released a web-based animation software tool called Movie Maker (alternately known as "Text-To-Movie"). Movie Maker offers users a more limited subset of functionality in exchange for the convenience of a web browser. Xtranormal videos could at one time be created through an interface directly on the YouTube website.

In 2011, Xtranormal launched a subscription service called Xtranormal for Education. This program aimed to empower teachers and students by giving them a new way to express themselves in the classroom. Teachers could create and grade animation-based assignments directly from their web browsers. Xtranormal for Education was implemented in K–12, university and special needs classes all over the world.

On January 30, 2013, Xtranormal's CEO at the time told Forbes magazine that Xtranormal was at break-even but the future was in mobile, so they were focusing on their new Tellagami app, a spinoff platform that is more limited than Xtranormal's. However, on June 28, 2013, the company stopped accepting new users, stopped processing transactions for its XP virtual currency, stopped distributing Xtranormal Desktop, and then announced that they would be discontinuing their current subscriptions, points plans and existing services as of July 31, 2013. They encouraged users to use up existing points and to publish and download their created movies before that date.

Xtranormal's online services were taken down shortly after, with the content of their website replaced by a holding page showing the company's logo, a set of media player control buttons, and the word "pause", but in early October, the placeholder was gone, thus their site was shut down completely. Its official YouTube, Facebook, and Twitter pages had also been deleted. The site was briefly home to a store called "The College Shop" in November 2013, but that disappeared as the following event took place.

In April 2014, Xtranormal's domain hosted a close mirror of the site called Nawmal Ltd. which acquired Xtranormal's intellectual property.

In July 2014, it was announced that the assets of Xtranormal had been acquired by Nawmal Ltd. As of 2016, Xtranormal's new parent company, Nawmal Inc. has split Xtranormal into 2 different animators named after the company itself, both just like Xtranormal, except one being for professional, and one being for education.

As of 2020, Xtranormal had a new feature of Nawmal Inc. but is introducing new VR, AR, advanced customization and more.

== Legacy ==
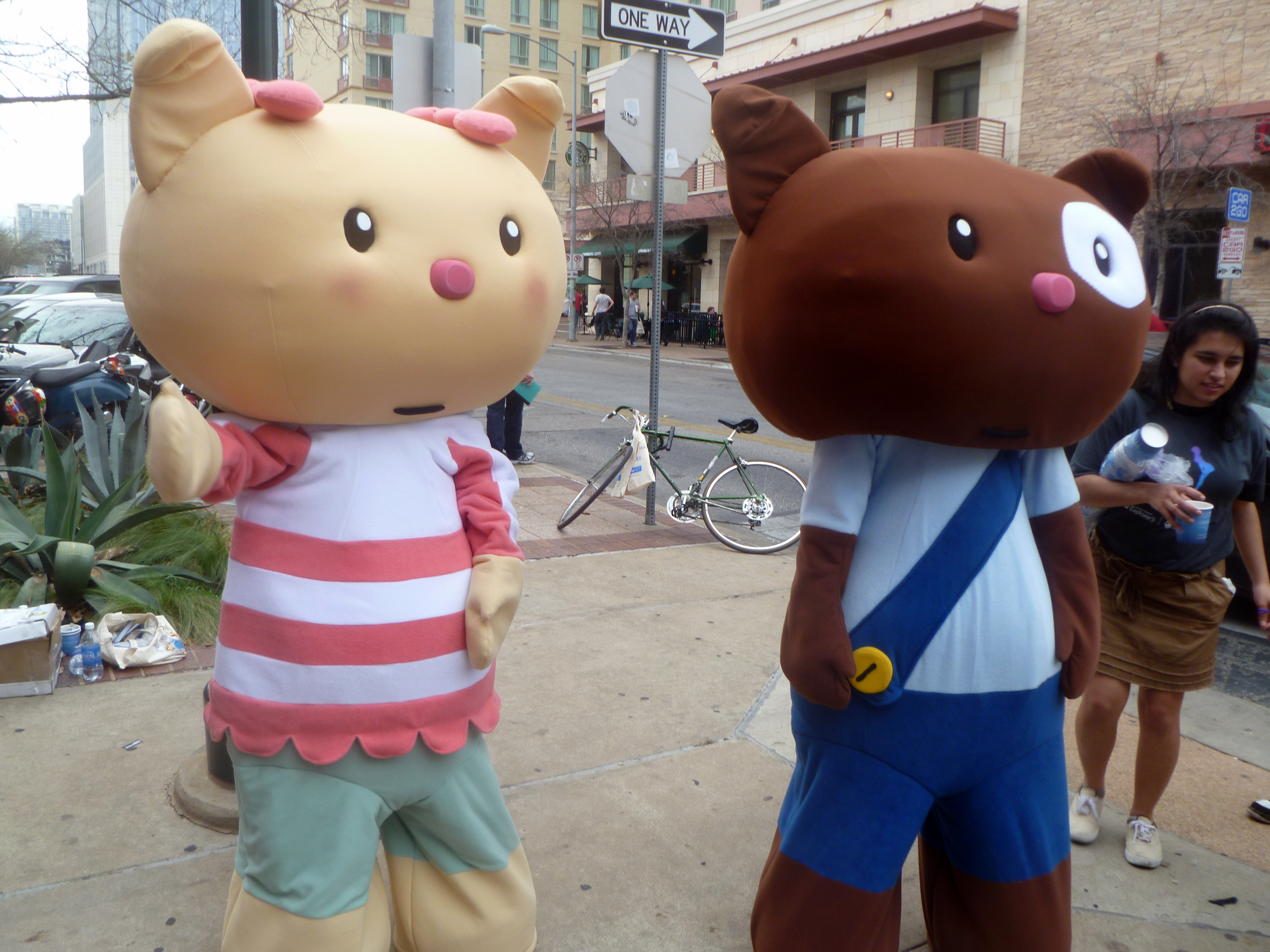
Xtranormal bear characters

Some user-created videos reached more than a million views on YouTube. According to NPR, Xtranormal's most successful videos featured a conversation between "a wise guy who is the voice of reason" and "a tone deaf, argumentative adversary". A popular subgenre of content involved career professionals satirizing their workplaces or students satirizing their college majors.

In 2010, the short film Sleeping with Charlie Kaufman by director J Roland Kelly, animated entirely with Nawmal, premiered at the Little Rock Film Festival and was shown at The Rome International Film Festival in Rome, Georgia. Xtranormal videos once formed a recurring feature on the late night FNC talk show Red Eye w/ Greg Gutfeld, and were featured as part of a GEICO advertising campaign. The Micros series of shorts about the world of online poker has been the most popular Xtranormal web-series on YouTube. Some videos created on Nawmal have appeared on shows such as The Colbert Report, The Kroll Show and Howard 100.

A viral November 2010 cartoon by real estate manager Omid Malekan criticizing quantitative easing by the Federal Reserve was referenced by Federal Reserve Chairman Ben Bernanke in his memoir.

== See also ==
- Vyond
- Muvizu
- Moviestorm
- iClone
- Powtoon
