= Shark 3D =

3D graphics software program and engine

- Original author: Spinor
- Developer: Spinor
- Initial release: February 2000; 25 years ago
- Written in: C++, Python
- Available in: English
- Type: 3D computer graphics, game engine
- Website: spinor.com

Shark 3D is an engine developed by Spinor for creating and viewing interactive 3D scenes. It is mainly used for developing video games and things similar to game engines, producing films and TV series, as well as creating broadcast graphics and developing 3D applications.

== Workflow ==
Animations are created by playing a scene as in video games within a virtual map.

An animator can record different characters and objects in different tracks to make their scene. For example, the animator can first play as one virtual actor and then play as another, while replaying the first one. A character or vehicle controlled live can physically interact with previously recorded characters and objects using the physics engine.

== Reception ==
=== Usage ===
Screenshot from the engine

Companies Funcom, Ravensburger Digital, Marc Weigert, Siemens, and ARD/ZDF/Pro 7/Disney Junior have or are currently using the program. In 2012, it was the second most used real-time 3D engine in Europe after Unity.

=== Awards ===
Awards given to products made with Shark 3D:

- Norwegian video game studio Funcom's PC and Xbox adventure video game Dreamfall: The Longest Journey was GameSpy's "Editor's choice" of the year 2006
- Media award "Der weiße Elefant" for the "innovative production" using Shark 3D of "D.I.E. – Detektive im Einsatz" running on Super RTL
- Lara-Award for the game Windchaser

=== Third-party plugins ===
- Camera tracking
- Cinector Motion capture
- RTF Massively multiplayer library

== See also ==
- Autodesk Maya
- Gamebryo
- iClone
- Motionbuilder
- Moviestorm
- Muvizu
- Nawmal
- Renderware
