= IClone =

Real-time 3D animation software

iClone
- Developer: Reallusion
- Stable release: 8.7 (8.7.5009.1) / February 12, 2026; 7 months ago
- Operating system: Windows
- Available in: English, French, German, Chinese
- Type: 3D computer graphics
- License: Trialware
- Website: www.reallusion.com

iClone is a real-time 3D animation and rendering software program developed and marketed by Reallusion. Real-time playback is enabled by using a 3D game engine for instant on-screen rendering.

Other functionality includes: full facial and skeletal animation of human and animal figures; lip-syncing; import of standard 3D file types including FBX; a timeline for editing and merging motions; a Python API and the Lua scripting language for character interaction; application of standard motion-capture files; the ability to control an animated scene in the same manner as playing a video game; and the import of models from Google 3D Warehouse, among other features. iClone also offers users royalty-free usage of all content that they create with the software, even when using Reallusion's own assets library.

== History and development ==
=== Origins and iClone 1.0 (2005) ===
Reallusion launched iClone v1.0 in December, 2005 as a tool to create 3D animation and render animated videos. It supported real-time 3D animation and creation of avatars from photographs. Reallusion’s facial mapping and lip-synch animation technology derived from the 2001 release of CrazyTalk 2D animation software. The face mapping tools and real-time 3D animation environment made iClone popular with the community of Machinima, which is a video game based filmmaking technique that transformed gamers into filmmakers by capturing live video action from within video games and virtual worlds, like Quake and Second Life. The ability of gamers to sell or broadcast their films was challenged by game makers. iClone v1.0 was adopted by many Machinima filmmakers and was showcased at the 2005 Machinima Film Festival held at the Museum of the Moving Image in Queens, New York. Reallusion's Vice President John C Martin II presented a demo of iClone at the Machinima Festival and stated that Reallusion would provide a full commercial license for all movies produced with v1.0 and all future versions.

=== iClone 2.0 (2007) ===
iClone v2.0 was released in March 2007. This update introduced new G2 character styles and Clone Cloth, which creates custom clothing for actors through editing materials and applying them to pre-designed 3D avatar models; it became one of the first ways iClone users could create and sell their own content for iClone. V2.0 also brought particle effects, fog and HD video output.

=== iClone 3.0 (2008) ===
iClone v3.0 was launched in August 2008, adding a revised UI featuring scene manager for organizing projects and enabling the viewport for live direct object picking and interaction. G3 characters enhanced Clone Cloth options and made character faces more refined with facial Normal Maps. The Editor Mode and Director Mode were introduced to enable a scene editing mode and a live real-time director control mode where users could pilot characters and vehicles with video game-like keyboard controls W, A, S, D. Animation created in Director Mode built a series of live motion data on the iClone timeline and was able to be tweaked in Editor Mode. Multi cameras were added in iClone v3.0 with camera switcher for filming scenes in multiple real-time angles. Character animation was made possible with motion editing for inverse and forward kinematics. Material editing became possible from within iClone so enhancing any prop or actor was capable by exporting and editing material textures and reapplying them to iClone. The stage was enhanced with Terrain, Sky, Water and the first appearance of SpeedTree natural tree and foliage designer. Multiple shader modes in Preview, Wireframe and Pixel shading became options for users to balance the screen output with their machine performance. The Certified Content creators program opened allowing iClone users to upload and market their custom content to a Reallusion hosted portal for content sales.

=== iClone 4.0 and 4.2 (2009–2010) ===
iClone v4.0 – October 2009 – Drag and drop manipulation and a gizmo for transforming objects within the 3D viewport was added in iClone v4.0. Importing any image or video as a 3D object for real-time playback enabled direct compositing of real-time 3D and video in iClone. Videos were able to be imported as alpha transparent with iClone’s PopVideo companion. Visual effects in iClone were further enhanced with the introduction of real-time HDR (High Dynamic Range) and IBL (Image based lighting). Characters were enhanced with G4 options for enhanced character body styles, improved body mesh and ability to import Poser and Second Life generated texture maps. Jimmy-toon G4 character was introduced as a customizable cartoon bodystyle avatar for iClone. iClone 4.2 released in May 2010 added stereoscopic 3D support for rendering images and video in anaglyph, side by side and top down formats.

=== iClone 5.0 and 5.5 (2011–2012) ===
iClone 5.0 and 5.5 released over 2011 and 2012 adding functions for motion capture, Human IK and a pipeline for importing and exporting FBX characters and props for use in game engines and other 3D production tools. Reallusion put emphasis on cross-compatibility with Unity, UDK, Autodesk 3D Studio Max, Maya, Z-brush, Allegorithmic, DAZ and Poser. The iClone Animation Pipeline became a trio of products: iClone PRO, 3DXchange for import, export and rigging, and the Mocap Device Plugin enabling real-time motion capture with the Microsoft Kinect for Windows and OpenNI sensor supported devices. The addition of HumanIK from Autodesk gave natural human motion to iClone and provided animation editing enhancement to generate better motions, foot & hand locking and reach targets for prop interaction. Animation generated with 5.0 and 5.5 could be exported for use external programs. Video game developers benefited from the iClone Animation Pipeline as a way to prepare custom actors for games with face and body animation ready to import into game projects. The iClone Animation Pipeline opened a portal for artists to access the Reallusion marketplace to acquire models, characters and motions for use in games and 3D development.

=== iClone 6.0 (2014) ===
iClone 6.0 released in December 2014, offered a large amount of visual and performance improvements like improved soft cloth physics simulation, object-oriented constraints, a new lighting system with the possibility for infinite lights instead of the previous 8 light system, light props, support for Allegorithmic's procedurally generated materials, and ultra realistic rendering with iClone's Indigo plug-in allowing users to raytrace their projects in Indigo RT for photo realistic results. This new iClone iteration was designed to allow for easy, future plug-in compatibility with other programs and applications. iClone 6.0 came updated for DirectX 11 bringing with it tessellation effects to add real-time geometric details to models, real-time surface smoothing to improve the appearance of objects and characters with more details and higher quality. Later iClone 6.02 was offered in a DirectX 9 version for legacy users that could not immediately upgrade to DirectX 11.

=== iClone 7.0 (2017) ===
iClone 7 released in 2017, bringing with it a completely new, visual posture. Compared to previous versions, iClone 7 included the latest visual technologies such as PBR (Physically-based Rendering), GI (Global Illumination), IBL (Image-based lighting), and a Real Camera System to help users produce photorealistic animations. Reallusion also upgraded iClone's data-exchange module - 3DXchange 7, making it smoother and more powerful as well. Compared to previous versions, the 3DXchange 7 can import and export more types of items like cameras, PBR content, and character morphs.

=== iClone 8.0 (2022) ===
iClone 8 introduces the Motion Director system, which allows animators to control characters in real time using game-style inputs such as gamepads, mouse-click navigation, and keyboard controls. The software includes an expanded animation toolkit featuring full-body IK (HumanIK), a Pose Mixer, animation layers, curve editing, and advanced motion blending tools. Real-time rendering is enhanced with volumetric lighting, motion blur, lens flares, mirror shaders, and support for NVIDIA Omniverse for GPU-based path-traced rendering. iClone 8 also improves scene management through collections, grouping, instancing, and project merging, along with flexible frame-rate rendering for video and compositing. It supports drag-and-drop import and export of common 3D formats such as FBX, OBJ, and USD, enabling integration into broader production pipelines.

== Applications ==
Besides being used as a 3D moviemaking tool, iClone is also a platform for video game development and previsualization allowing users to import and export content such as characters, props and animation data with external 3D tools like Unreal Engine, Unity, Autodesk Maya, 3ds Max, Blender, ZBrush, Poser and many others through popular industry file formats like FBX, OBJ and BVH.

Other applications include using iClone as a 3D simulator for education, industry and business since iClone's real-time capabilities allow for direct "WASD" controls through keyboards or other input devices.

Motion capture known as Mocap, is another iClone feature that allows users to connect multiple motion capturing hardware, from popular industry sources, and combine them into one or more subjects in real-time. This is done through iClone's universal mocap platform Motion LIVE. With iClone Motion LIVE users are able to acquire profiles (plug-ins) for their necessary hardware (gear) to seamlessly stream, capture and later edit animation data inside iClone's buil-in motion editing suite. These motions can then be exported by using iClone's 3DXchange Pipeline software using FBX and BVH. iClone also includes an Unreal Engine 4 LIVE LINK plug-in which live streams full-body, hand and facial animation directly from iClone to UE4 for realtime animation production. A similar plug-in is currently being developed for use with iClone and Unity's Mecanim system.

Since its 6.5 update, iClone allows for quick 360-Video output, allowing users to turn animation projects into 360 panorama videos. Another update is the Alembic export capability, an interchange point cache format used by visual effects and animation professionals, that allows iClone animation detail export to other game engines, or 3D tools.

Version 7.0 introduced a reworked architecture that would finally grant iClone customization options for users who wished to create their own Python based plug-ins for use with a wide range of motion capture suits, facial mocap profiles, hardware devices and others.

== Features ==
- Production – Preset Layouts for Directing, In-screen Editing, Drag-n-Drop Creation, Play-to-Create Controls, Animation Path & Transition.
- Actor – Character Base & Templates, Custom 3D Head from Photo, Facial & Body Deformation, Custom Clothing Design.
- Animation – MixMoves Motion Graph System, Motion Capture with Depth Cam, Face and Body Puppeteering, Face and Body Motion Key Editing, Audio Lipsyncing, Character Embedded Performances.
- Prop – Interactive Props with iScript, Soft and Rigid Body Physics Animation, FLEX & Spring simulation, Multi-channel Material Textures, Animated UV Props, Prop Puppet.
- Stage – Modular Scene Construction, Flexible environment System (Atmosphere, HDR, IBL), Ambient Occlusion, Toon Shader, Fog.
- Camera – Camera Gizmo & Camera Studio (PIP), Animatable Lenses, Link-to & Look-at, Lighting Systems, Depth of Field, Shadow.
- Video Effects – Real-time Particle FX, Material FX, Media Compositing, Post FX.
- Render & Output – Real-time Render, Image Sequence for Post Editing, Popular Image & Video Format Output, stereoscopic 3D Output.

== Content ==
Users can purchase content from the Reallusion Content Store for iClone, CrazyTalk, CrazyTalk Animator, FaceFilter and 3DXChange. The store also hosts content packs from third-party developers such as Daz 3D, 3D Total Materials, 3D Universe, Dexsoft, Quantum Theory Ent. and others. The Reallusion Marketplace provides a trading platform for independent content developers.

== See also ==
- Moviestorm
- Muvizu
- Nawmal
- Shark 3D
