= Peter Arvai =

Hungarian-Swedish businessman (born 1979)

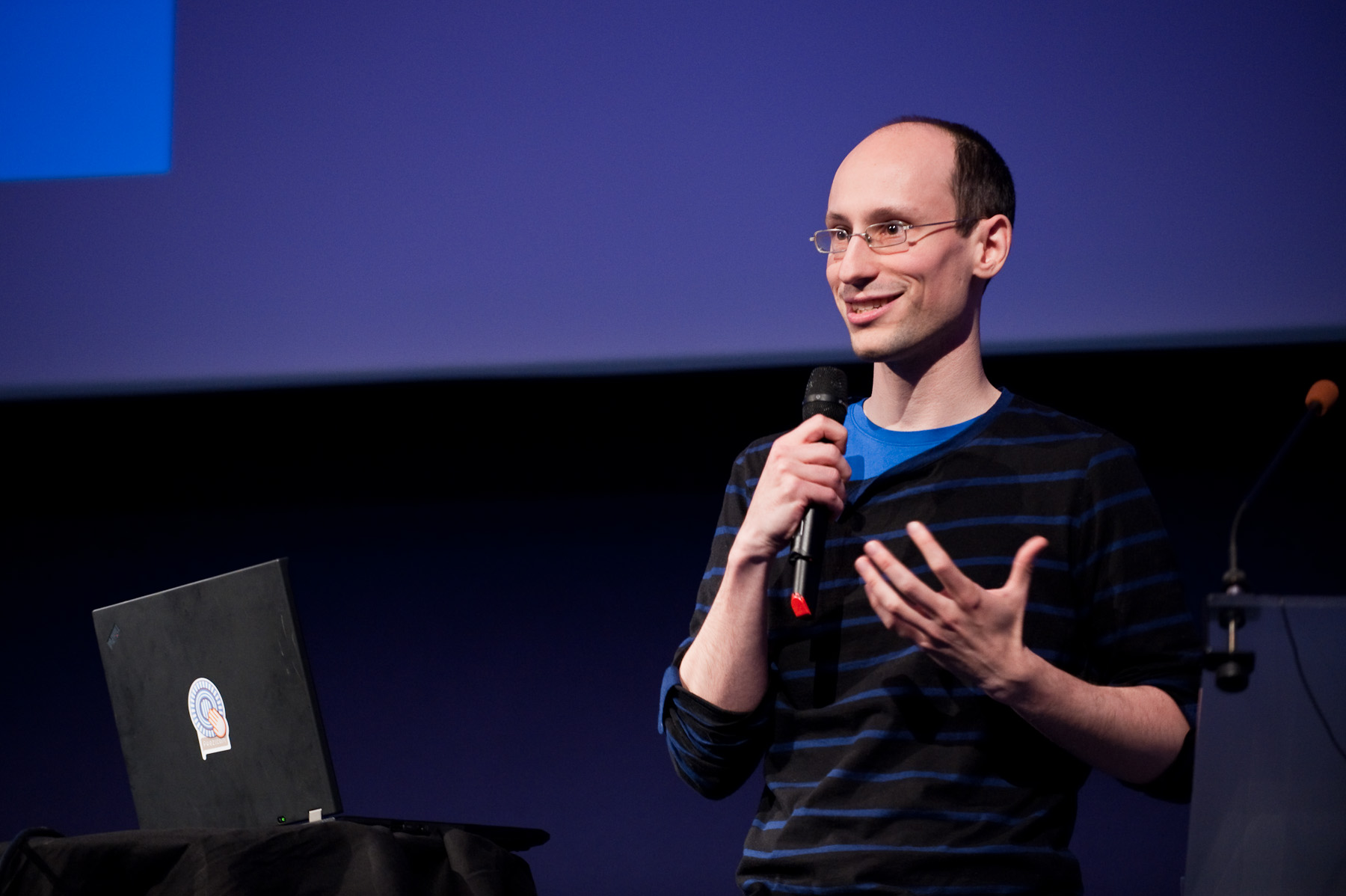
- Born: 26 October 1979 (age 47); Karlskoga, Sweden
- Education: Stockholm University; Royal Institute of Technology
- Occupations: Businessman, activist

Peter Arvai (born October 26, 1979) is a Hungarian–Swedish businessman and activist. He is the Executive Chairman, co-founder and former CEO of Prezi, a cloud-based presentation software company. As an entrepreneur, he founded omvard.se in Sweden, and co-founded Prezi in 2009 along with designer Adam Somlai-Fischer and computer scientist and university professor Peter Halacsy. As of 2020, Prezi has more than 100 million users worldwide.

== Early life and education ==
Arvai was born in Karlskoga, Sweden to Hungarian parents. He has lived in Tokyo, Stockholm, Singapore, San Francisco and Budapest, and is a graduate of Stockholm University. While in Japan, he studied Japanese and completed a training program at Fuji Xerox. As part of his business program, Arvai studied economics in Singapore for an exchange semester, and was one of the first batch of students to attend the newly introduced Master in Media Technology and Engineering program (1999-2005) at the Royal Institute of Technology. After graduating Arvai co-founded the program's alumni group.

== Career ==
Arvai was the Vice President of Product Portfolio for Mobispine, a Swedish mobile communications company. He developed the first mobile news reader app through his work on a mobile innovator to track TED Talks on mobile devices, with Joacim Boivie and Joakim Hilj. In Sweden, Arvai started omvard.se, a company that helped patients compare hospital treatment outcomes. In 2009, omvard.se won the Best Web Site Award from Swedish magazine Internetworld.

In 2009, Arvai co-founded Prezi, a presentation software, with Ádám Somlai-Fischer and Péter Halácsy. He approached TED Conference given the companies' common vision of promoting the open exchange of ideas and pitched the investment idea to the conference. TED Conference, Accel Partners and Sunstone Capital were Prezi's investors that participated in Series A and Series B funding rounds. In November 2014, a C Series $57 million investment was led by Spectrum Equity and Accel Partners.

In March 2014, Arvai met with then-U.S. President Barack Obama in support of the President's TechEd program. In May 2017, Prezi bought the Latvian-based software company Infogram, which specializes in data visualization; it became Prezi Design. In late 2019, Prezi launched Prezi Video, which allows users to add graphics into the primary screen of videos in realtime, like a news broadcast.

In May 2017, Prezi bought the Latvian-based software company Infogram, which specializes in data visualization and became Prezi Design. He led the launch of Prezi Video in November 2019, which allows users to give virtual presentations in the screen of live or recorded videos, like a news broadcast. In July 2020, Peter decided to step back from the CEO role, putting Jim Szafranski, the former COO of Prezi, in charge. As of 2020, Prezi has more than 100 million users worldwide.

== Other work ==
Arvai is co-founder and chairman of the organization Bridge Budapest, which publishes about five million inspirational stories each year. Since its inception in 2013, the organization has launched several campaigns, including the Conscious Entrepreneurial Initiative or the Edison Platform, which organizes summer camps for hundreds of children.

Together with Google and espell, Arvai founded WeAreOpen, a nonprofit organization dedicated to openness, justice and change. By November 2019, more than 1000 companies/organizations representing over 75,000 employees had joined the initiative. Arvai is also one of the founders of StartUp Hungary.

== Personal life ==
Arvai speaks English, Swedish, Hungarian and Japanese fluently and is a Yoga and meditation enthusiast. He was the first visibly openly gay CEO in Hungary, coming out in 2015 in a Forbes piece. Arvai and Prezi participate in the Budapest Pride event in Budapest.

== Awards ==
- 2014: European Tech Startups Award for Best Startup Co-Founders
- 2014: European Web Entrepreneur of the Year
- 2015: Executive of the Year – Business Services: Bronze Stevie Winner
- 2016: Number 11 on the 2016 OUTstanding & Financial Times Leading LGBT Executives List of 100
- 2018: Number 3 on the 2018 Financial Times LGBT Executive Diversity list of 100 executives worldwide.

== Publications ==
Peter Arvai is author of "Developing the Business Case for a New Mobile Service: An Exercise in Business Model Designing" - VDM Verlag June 25, 2008.
