= Moviestorm =

Real-time 3D animation software

- Moviestorm 1.1 running on Windows XP
- Developer: Moviestorm Ltd
- Initial release: August 2008; 17 years ago
- Stable release: 1.6.1 / 16 January 2014; 12 years ago
- Operating system: Windows
- Type: 3D animation
- License: Trialware
- Website: moviestorm.co.uk

Filmmaker (previously known as Moviestorm) is a real-time 3D animation app published by Moviestorm Ltd.

== History ==
Founded as a startup in Cambridge by Machinima experts Matt Kelland and Dave Lloyd. Moviestorm has been generally available since August 2008 and over 160,000 people have now registered to use it.

The interface has undergone fairly radical change since its first incarnation. Many User Interface improvements were implemented with the release of version 1.3 in June 2010 and version 1.4, released in August 2010, contained some long-awaited upgrades especially in the Dressing room which allows much more control over facial morphing of avatars. This release also features a completely new lighting system which more closely resfembles the 3-light systems used in real live action filming. Version 1.5 was released on 8 December, and featured many upgrades to the program, including an auto save feature, a new video export format, and a "terrain editor", where users can now edit the default green mountains surrounding the set.

== Business model ==
Users can purchase the application outright with different content bundling options. As of 2011, users can create their own custom "gestures" with the release of the Moviestorm skeletons.

== Examples of use ==
=== Children's animation ===
Blockhouse TV, based in Norwich, UK, utilised Moviestorm in their animated series for children, Jack and Holly. The first season, Jack and Holly's Christmas Countdown, was released in 2010.

=== Film and media teaching ===
Moviestorm has been used in film schools and media courses in many countries. Wan Smolbag Theatre in Vanuatu was one of the first to adopt it in 2008, under tutor John Herd. Students trained on Moviestorm have gone on to successful careers with the island's TV network. It is in use at many different educational sectors, from elementary schools to sixth form colleges and universities.

In addition to film teaching, Moviestorm has been used in educational contexts for a variety of other media, including computer games and music.

=== Other education ===
Some teachers have found Moviestorm useful as a cross-curricular tool for collaborative creative expression. Paul Carr at Sakuragaoka Junior and Senior High School, Japan uses it to help teach English to Japanese students. One of his techniques is to create silent videos for which the students then have to compose dialog. Other teachers have found it useful for helping autistic students to make presentations, since they can prepare their presentation as a video instead of having to stand up in front of a class.

=== Business ===
Commercial companies including Oracle Corporation and Fujitsu have used Moviestorm to create low-cost training videos. Other companies have used it to create cheap advertising content that can be produced in-house. Think Industries in Eastern England is an advertising and marketing company that uses Moviestorm to pitch its ideas to prospective clients. "Pitching is key, and you have to stand out," said owner Philip Morley in an interview in 2011. "Video is just so much more powerful than text. People will watch even if they don't read documents. It's now cost-effective to create custom videos for every pitch. I can re-use a lot of the material I already have, and just tweak it as I need. I can more or less change things in real time if necessary."

=== Music video ===
Moviestorm has been used as a low-cost alternative for bands wanting to create animated videos. The first commercial band to do so was Vice Romania in November 2008. Their video to This Is It was created by Lucinda McNary of Two Moon Graphics in Kansas. Moviestorm footage was combined with a character filmed in DAZ3D and composited using greenscreen.

In 2009, Priscilla Angelique started using Moviestorm to create videos for several tracks on her London-based label A Priscilla Thing. "Music videos are a very expensive and time consuming process but Moviestorm allows me to achieve shots and effects that even with a modest budget would still be very out of reach," she said in an interview in late 2010.

In November 2011, Chicago chiptune band I Fight Dragons ran a contest challenging Moviestorm users to make the official video for their single, Working. (Moviestorm user and then-film student Kera "162" Hildebrandt would win the contest with her entry.)

=== Previsualization and film pitching ===
Moviestorm's rapid production has led to it being used by live action filmmakers and scriptwriters for pre-production. Since the footage used in previsualization is not intended to be included in the final product, the quality of the graphics is not a critical consideration. Independent filmmaker D.L. Watson in Oregon used it to create a complete animated storyboard on his short film The Letter (2009). London-based scriptwriter Dean P. Wells uses it to test out movie ideas and then creates trailers based on his scripts.

== See also ==
- iClone
- Muvizu
- Nawmal
- Shark 3D
