= Kitchen Budapest =

Hungarian innovation lab

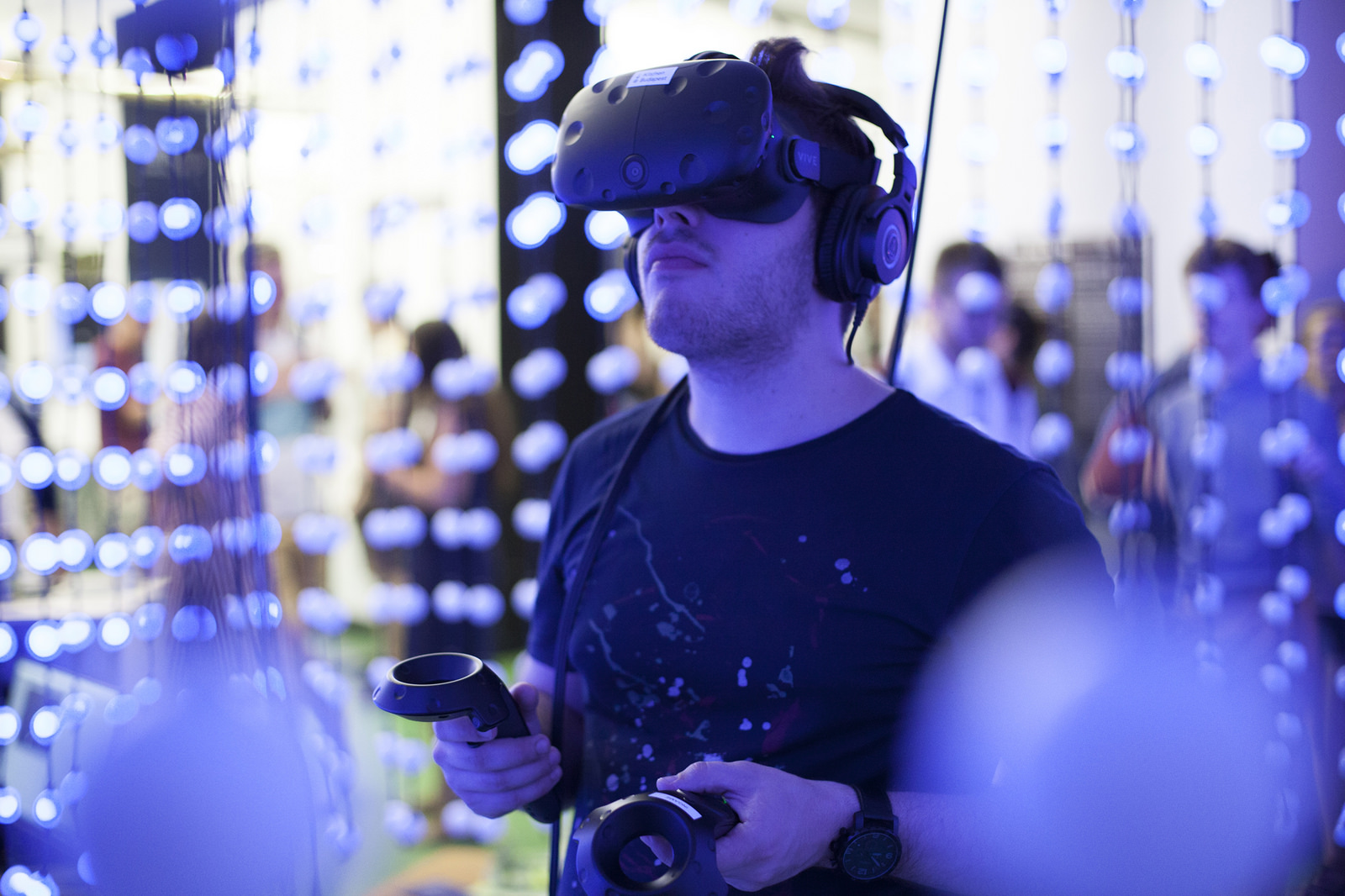

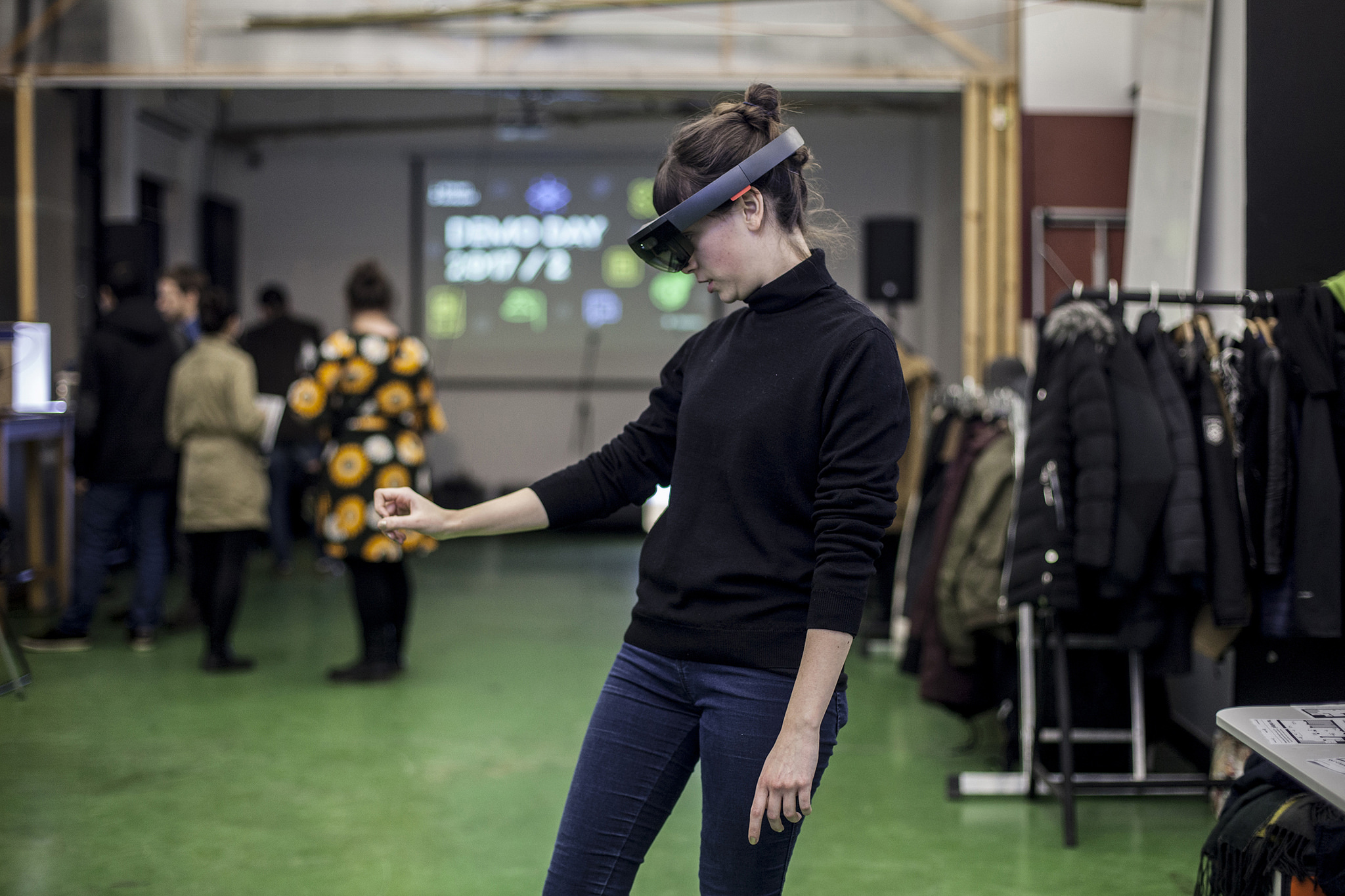
Demo Day 2017

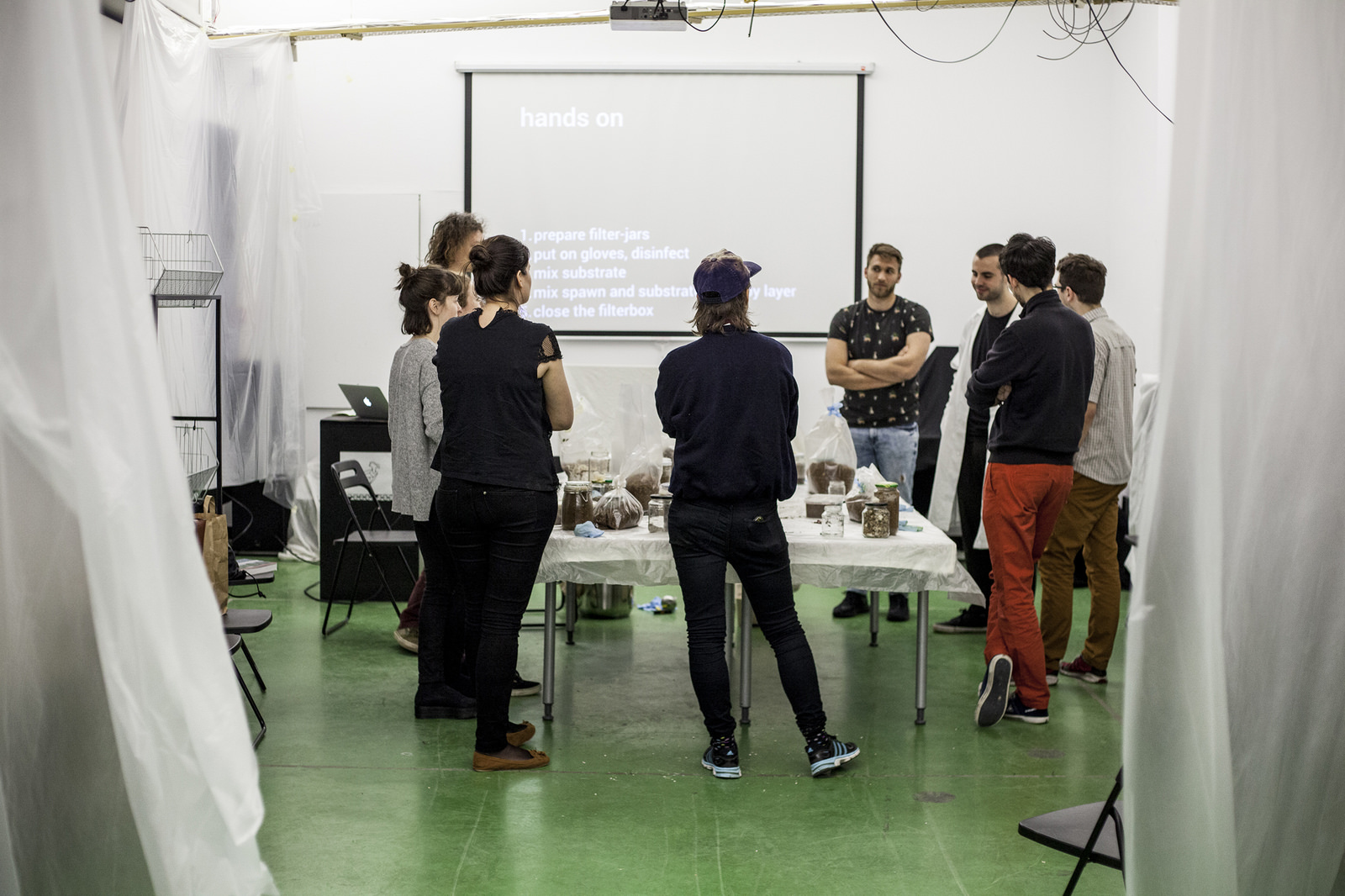

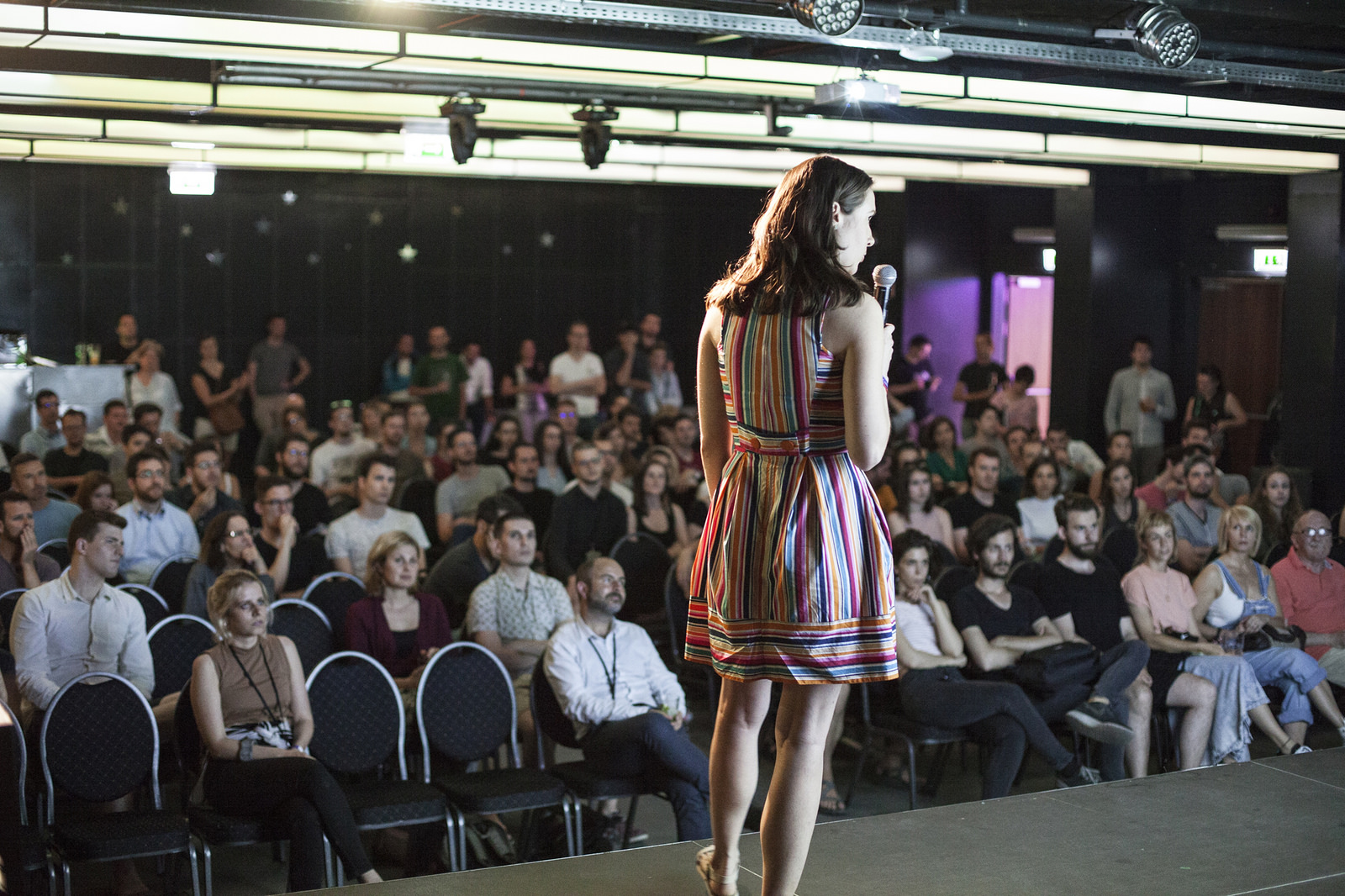

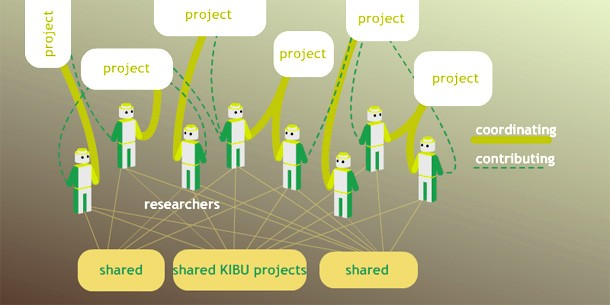
Working method

Kitchen Budapest (KiBu) is an innovation lab based in Budapest, Hungary. It was founded in 2007 by a group of media artists, theoreticians and coders. It was sponsored by Magyar Telekom. Founding members include Adam Somlai-Fischer, Peter Halacsy, Robin Nagy, Attila Nemes, and Eszter Bircsák to instigate digital literacy and DIY techniques.

KiBu incorporates three functions including research and development (prototyping, testing, service design, UX/UI design), education (next generation programs as Talent and Lift) and industry collaboration.

KiBu connects corporate demands with creative supplies, theoretic bias of academic education with tools of the maker culture, talented young people with professional support, global innovation with situated, everyday use. KiBu worked within a network of media labs and bears established contacts with the local universities.

KiBu is a space dedicated to developing and testing new ideas. Through events such as 24-hour hackathons and intensive workshop sessions, participants experiment with methodologies, concepts, products and services. The facility includes a workshop with equipment that supports a wide range of projects, from 3D printing to high-fidelity rendering tasks. Prototypes created during this events are presented at Demo Day, the organization's biannual showcase event.

== Associated people ==
=== Alumni ===
- Adam Somlai-Fischer, co-founder of Prezi
- Peter Halacsy, CTO of Prezi
- David Lakatos, co-founder of Sold.
- György Péter, media theorist
- Nemes Attila, art historian, curator
- Bujdosó Attila, architect
- Bircsák Eszter
- Sipos Melinda
- Sik Eduárd, technologist

== Sources ==
- SubMap × UrbanCyclr, in: Visual Simplexity , Entwickler.Press, 2013, ISBN 978-3-86802-099-1, p. 195.
- A Touch of Code, in: A Touch of Code, Gestalten, 2011, ISBN 978-3-89955-331-4, p. 60-61, p. 224-225.
- mcd musiques & cultures digitales #62 , March–April–May 2011, ISBN 978-2-9529872-1-9 ISSN 1638-3400, p. 76-77.
- Science Parks vs. Boutique Labs / Businessweek, June 1, 2009
- About Kitchen Budapest
