= Cartoon Classics =

Cartoon Classics may refer to:

- Walt Disney Cartoon Classics, a compilation series of cartoons published by Disney
- Weird-Ass Cartoon Classics, a show aired on MTV
- Cartoon Classics, series of videos published by Vyond

== See also ==
- Color Classics
