= Jack and Holly =

2010 British preschool TV animated series

- Created by: Blockhouse TV
- Starring: Cillian Martin Wright; Emilia Shuardson-Hipkin
- Country of origin: United Kingdom

Original release
- Release: 1 September 2010

Jack and Holly is a British preschool animated series that centres on two characters, Jack and Holly. It was launched as a freely available TV series on all IPTV platforms Limited edition DVDs were distributed to children's hospices around the UK on a NFP basis to raise funds.

== Main characters ==
Jack (voiced by Cillian Martin Wright, the son of the producer) and Holly (voiced by Emilia Shuardson-Hipkin and later by Julianne Martin) are two best friends. Holly is the big sister that Jack never had. As 'Jack' actor Cillian Martin Wright puts it, "Holly is always there to take Jack and viewers by the hand and lead them through life's moral maze with advice and guidance."

== Series philosophy ==
The series is educational as well as entertaining. It includes a lot of factual material aimed at pre-school and primary school children, as well as stories. "I think it counters a lot of the very brash, bright colours, fast cut aggressive programming that is aimed at children," said Director Jezz Wright in a 2010 interview with the BBC. "When we had our son five years ago we bought quite a few educational DVDs and we were quite horrified just how little educative content there was. It was a conversation you have one evening with the other half - 'come on we can do better than this' - and so the seed was planted." "With the release of their second feature film (Cosmic Stories) this ethos caught the imagination of the British press with headlines around the world."

"We're a tiny team with a tiny fraction of Disney's budget" said producer Julianne Wright in a 2011 press release. "We hope we're delivering the sort of original content parents are looking for. Children's screen time has never been more contentious - that's why we believe all children's media should aspire to the highest educative standards." The series was developed with the assistance of teachers and educationalists as well as parents in order to ensure that it would fit in well with British educational standards.

The series also promotes inclusiveness and multi-culturalism. Jack is from ethnic origin whilst Holly is a typical 'English Rose' Caucasian-race|Caucasian character.

This approach led them to set out to create a multimedia product that would encourage children to spend time away from the screen and enjoy reading, and would also give parents topics to discuss with their children. In their second animated series, Cosmic Stories, they include an on-screen timer that helps parents see how much time their child is spending in front of the television.

== Animation style ==
The animation is created in a mixed media style derived from machinima, mixed in with live action footage. It uses a variety of software including Moviestorm, which allowed the animators to create the series quickly and on a low budget. Some of the live footage is blended with animation to create a unique look.

Although the characters share some visual similarities with Japanese Anime characters and cartoons they have a distinctive design. They do not have legs, but instead they float, fly and hover. The color palette was designed specifically to appeal to younger children.

The character design of both Jack and Holly were originally visualised by Motion artist Bonnie Scott and Jezz Wright, though it was modified extensively for the animated series before production began.

== Broadcast ==
In November 2012 'Jack & Holly'launched their own Roku & IPTV channels. In November 2013 IPTV NewCo Toon Goggles & The Cartoon Club Network acquired broadcasting rights. The last broadcast was on 26 August 2015. Episodes of Jack and Holly are now available through various Apple and Android apps.

== Future ==
There are no more episodes planned.

== Releases ==
=== Jack and Holly's Christmas Countdown ===
This was released in September 2010 in the UK, and in October 2011 in the US on Roku set-top IPTV and Google TV.

It is a non-religious themed celebration of the spirit of Christmas and includes a number of early learning puzzles, songs and situations.

==== Episode listing ====
The series includes ten 5-minute episodes

1. Snow
2. Snowmen
3. Furry Animals
4. Santa Land
5. Christmas Tree
6. Presents
7. Father Christmas
8. Songs on the telly
9. Christmas Eve
10. Christmas Day

==== Jack and Holly's Cosmic Stories ====
Originally titled Jack and Holly's Cosmic Stories, this was released worldwide in November 2011 on Roku set-top IPTV and SMART TV's.

It includes seven episodes.

===== Episode listing =====
1. The Moon
2. The Sun
3. Planets
4. New Worlds?
5. Black Holes
6. Aliens?
7. Twinkle Twinkle

=== Books ===
The Jack and Holly books combined fun activities with stories and educational material, puzzles, and games. Both were available as free downloads via their web site. As of November 2011, a third publication, Jack and Holly's Cosmic Comic, featured all of the major characters from all the series.

==== Jack and Holly's Christmas Annual ====
This interactive workbook, released in August 2010, consisted of 24 puzzles and simple exercises for parents and children can enjoy together.

==== Jack and Holly's Cosmic Comic ====
This included comic book styled stories as well as science facts. It was released in November 2011.A set of children's trading cards 'Swapzees' were available as a free download from the website to accompany the comic. These Christmas themed swap-cards feature all the major characters from the series and are individually rated for 'festive' & 'fun'.

=== Music ===
==== Jack and Holly's Christmas Top Ten ====
"Jack and Holly's Christmas Top 10" was released on 21 August 2010. The free download album included updated and modernised versions of Christmas classics. Most of the tracks were featured in the Jack and Holly's Christmas Countdown series and were produced by Tom Richardson and Jezz Wright. Tom Richardson was also the Sound Designer for the series. Track 4 was written by Tim Buxton who produced it alongside Jezz Wright.

===== Track listing =====
1. Jack and Holly Theme
2. Wish You a Merry Christmas
3. O' Christmas Tree
4. Here Comes Christmas
5. Christmas Wrapping (ft. Dj Santa)
6. Jingle Bells (ft. Dj Santa)
7. Snowmen Come and Snowmen Go
8. Snowballs (ft. Dj Santa)
9. Deck the Halls (with Jack and Holly)
10. Sing Song Merrily on High
11. Jingle Bells (Dj Santa's dub remix)
