= CrazyTalk =

2D animation software

- Developer: Reallusion
- Stable release: 8 / 22 January 2016; 10 years ago
- Operating system: Windows XP and later OS X 10.6 and later
- Available in: English, French, German, Chinese; Japanese (AH-Software)
- Type: 2D computer graphics
- License: Trialware
- Website: reallusion.com/crazytalk/ ah-soft.com/ct/

CrazyTalk is Reallusion's brand name for its 2D animation software. The product series includes CrazyTalk, a 2D facial animation software tool, and CrazyTalk Animator, a face and body 2D animation suite.

CrazyTalk is a real-time, 2D animation and rendering software developed and marketed by Reallusion, which is mainly used to make 2D animated cartoons. Features include facial animation tool that uses voice and text to animate facial images, auto motion engine that uses the intensity of animator's voice to drive their animations in real-time. As of January 2016, the CrazyTalk software is in version 8.

CrazyTalk was licensed in Japan by AH-Software since 2009 (starting with version 5); the last Japanese-localized version, CrazyTalk 7, was released for Windows and Mac OS X in June 2013.

CrazyTalk 8 does not have further updates or releases as it is a legacy product. (Note that a statement to this effect appears in the Google search results for the official website, but confusingly does not appear to be on the official website).

== Applications ==
CrazyTalk is also a platform for app game development. Other applications include using CrazyTalk as a 2D training and marketing resource for education, industry, and business. CrazyTalk allows exporting projects to iOS devices and directly publish them to social websites like Facebook, and Twitter, or use embedded codes to fit interactive talking avatars into HTML web designs.

CrazyTalk and CrazyTalk Animator was used by Network studios in their daily production due to short delivery deadlines and used by television shows like Jimmy Kimmel LIVE! to produce real-time animations for broadcast.

== History and development ==
Reallusion Inc. was founded in 1993 and established its Silicon Valley-based subsidiary in 2000. The company develops 3D software specializing in digital human creation, real-time character animation, and digital twin simulations. The platform's ecosystem, anchored by industry-standard tools like Character Creator 5 and iClone 8, utilizes a hybrid workflow to control 3D animation with generative AI. The platform features an AI Studio that transforms 3D previsualization projects directly into photorealistic or stylized cinematic renders while maintaining character consistency across shots using the AI Actor Creator. Reallusion provides scalable, production-ready solutions for media, gaming, and virtual production, and supplies high-fidelity 3D assets licensed specifically for machine learning training.
