= National Design Award of Latvia =

National design award in Latvia

- Native name: Latvijas Dizaina gada balva
- Awarded for: Achievements in Latvian design
- Country: Latvia
- Presented by: Latvian Design Centre
- First award: 2017
- Website: dizainabalva.lv/eng/

The National Design Award of Latvia (Latvian: Latvijas Dizaina gada balva; NDAL), also referred to in English-language coverage as the Latvian Design Award, is a national competition and award for design in Latvia. It was established in 2017 with support from the Latvian Ministry of Culture to identify, evaluate and promote achievements by Latvian designers and to encourage the use of design created in Latvia.

The organisers and Latvian Public Media describe it as Latvia's highest recognition in design. The competition covers product, service, communication and environmental design, as well as digital solutions; work by emerging designers is evaluated separately in recent editions.

== History ==
H2E organised the first three editions, from 2017 to 2019. The inaugural competition in 2017 received 147 entries, and an international jury selected 20 finalists. The first prize went to the data-visualisation service Infogram. In 2018, 127 works were submitted. The first prize was awarded to the visual communication and spatial design created for the Riga International Film Festival by Associates, Partners et Sons. The 2019 award went to the #iamintrovert campaign developed for Latvian Literature.

The Latvian Designers' Society was selected to organise the competition in 2020 and 2021. The 2020 edition was deferred to the following year while the organisers revised the format and held preparatory events. The 2021 competition introduced five categories and attracted 150 entries. Jury members described the award as both a record of the current state of Latvian design and a means of explaining design to the public. The Grand Award was given to Stories in Sounds, a book with augmented-reality elements created by Maija Rozenfelde and a design team, and the winners and finalists were subsequently presented in an outdoor exhibition in Riga and Liepāja.

The Latvian Design Centre organised the 2023–2025 award cycle and was selected to continue for a further three years, through the 2026–2028 cycle. The current competition framework is aligned with the Latvian Design Strategy 2022–2027 and the principles of the New European Bauhaus.

== Format and evaluation ==
Works realised in Latvia may be entered regardless of their authors' nationality. Works realised elsewhere are eligible when their authors' country of affiliation is Latvia. Entries may be submitted by authors, owners, clients or other people connected with the work.

Recent editions use five categories: product design, service design, communication design, environmental design and digital solutions. The competition has a selection stage followed by evaluation by a final international jury. Finalists present their work to the jury, which chooses the category winners, the Grand Prix and the Emerging Designer Award. The Grand Prix recipient receives a €2,000 Ministry of Culture prize in recent editions.

The assessment criteria include originality; the definition of the problem and the suitability of the proposed solution; co-creation and stakeholder involvement; functionality and technology; aesthetics and the quality of experience; economic relevance, sustainability and circularity; and social relevance, inclusion and accessibility.

== Public programme ==
Exhibitions have accompanied the competition since its first edition. The Museum of Decorative Arts and Design displayed 20 finalists in both 2017 and 2018. The 2021 finalists and recipients were shown on outdoor advertising structures in Riga and Liepāja. In 2025, an open-air exhibition at the Esplanāde in central Riga presented the winners and finalists, including student projects and commissions for public institutions.

== Selected principal recipients ==
Year	Principal distinction	Recipient or work	Source
2017	First prize	Infogram	
2018	First prize	Visual communication and spatial design for the Riga International Film Festival, by Associates, Partners et Sons	
2019	Top award	#iamintrovert campaign for Latvian Literature	
2021	Grand Award	Stories in Sounds, a book with augmented-reality elements by Maija Rozenfelde and a design team	
2023	Grand Prix	Ēter, for the exhibition scenography of Weird Sensation Feels Good: The World of ASMR at the Design Museum, London	
2024	Grand Prix	Pre-Loved biotextile, by Sarmīte Poļakova and Māra Bērziņa	
2025	Grand Prix	Magic, for the Slimība izārda, cerība dziedē! campaign for the charity marathon Dod pieci!	
2026	Grand Prix	Design of the Baltic pavilion We Are One at Expo 2025, by Variant Studio, Ozols IR, Inspired, 7.A.M, YesWeCan and Datu Tehnoloģiju grupa	

== Reception and sector discussion ==
Coverage of the 2021 edition described the award as one of the principal events in Latvia's design industry and discussed its role in documenting current practice and explaining the field to a wider audience. A 2026 Latvian Radio assessment reported that jury deliberations were especially difficult when categories brought together projects of substantially different types. Participants also identified strong aesthetics as a feature of Latvian design while arguing that designers' presentation and storytelling skills required further development.
