= Sleeping with Charlie Kaufman =

- Directed by: J Roland Kelly
- Production companies: Osipa Media; Xtranormal
- Release date: June 3, 2010
- Running time: 1:59
- Country: United States
- Language: English

Sleeping with Charlie Kaufman is a 2010 American short animated comedy film created by J Roland Kelly using Xtranormal.

It held its premiere on June 3, 2010 at the Little Rock Film Festival, where it was one of the contenders for the Charles B. Pierce Award for the best Arkansas-made film, and it was also shown as part of The Rome International Film Festival in Rome, Georgia.

== Plot ==
In an interview with Xtranormal, J Roland Kelly describes the film as "...basically this absurd, funny conversation between a guy and his girlfriend. He tells her he fantasizes about her twin sister, but she doesn't have a twin sister, so it's just another way of fantasizing about her… and is she offended. [It draws on] some La Nouvelle Vague & Mumblecore elements from the kind of films I was watching at the time."

== See also ==
- Surreal humor
- Charlie Kaufman
