= FrameForge 3D Studio =

FrameForge Storyboard Studio
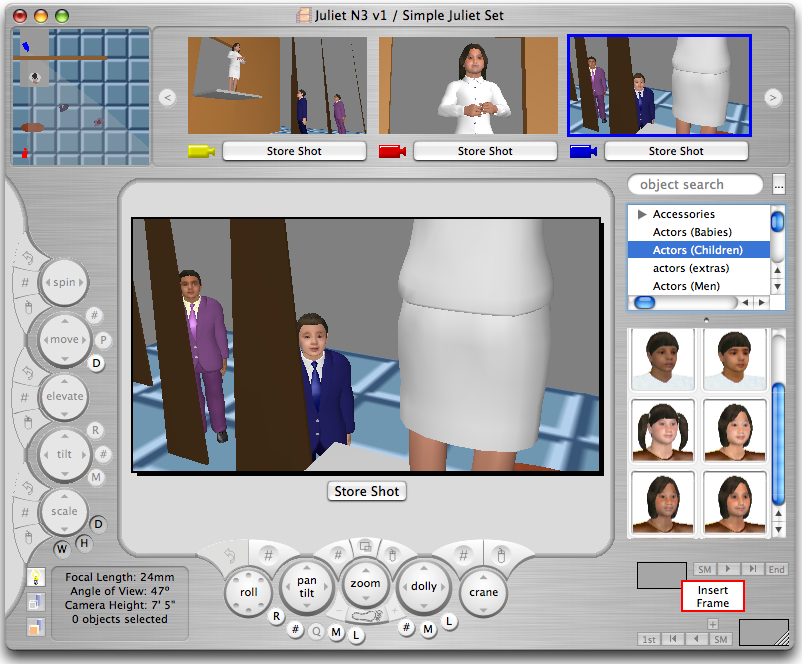
- FrameForge Storyboard Studio on Mac OS X
- Developer: Innoventive Software
- Stable release: Version 4 / December 2019
- Operating system: Mac OS X, Windows
- Type: Pre-production
- License: Proprietary
- Website: Official website

FrameForge Storyboard Studio (formerly FrameForge Previz Studio) is previsualization storyboard software used by directors, cinematographers, VFX Supervisor and other creatives in the fields of filmmaking, television production, filmed advertising, industrial videos and other filmed or video content.

The software creates virtual sets and locations using simulated cameras, actors and objects in photo-accurate 3D scaled sets for previsualization. FrameForge creates data-rich Storyboards and exports these sequences for use at all stages of production for both traditional 2D shoots and, with the introduction of version 3, stereoscopic 3D shoots too. It won a Technical Achievement Emmy from the National Academy of Arts and Sciences. for the program's "proven track record of saving productions time and money through virtual testing."

It also won a Lumiere Award from the Advanced Imaging Society (previously the International 3D Society) for the program's support of stereoscopic 3D filmmaking.

== Background ==
The program was designed by filmmaker Ken Schafer and his San Diego–based software company Innoventive Software, LLC. A graduate of New York University's film program, Schafer started software programming in the 1980s by creating an extensive system of macros for WordPerfect that automatically formatted text into screenplay format. He packaged these macros and sold them under the name Script Perfection. The macros evolved into the stand-alone program called ScriptThing and was eventually exclusively licensed for sale by Screenplay Systems under the name of Movie Magic Screenwriter. Schafer followed up with other software designs including the program FrameForge Storyboard Studio.

FrameForge was developed using the Delphi programming language (Delphi 5).

== Awards ==
- Technical Achievement Emmy from the National Academy of Arts and Sciences in the Pre-production Previsualization System Category. One of the key criteria for this Emmy was that the pre-visualization capability of this software allows the user to test and solve real-world production issues during pre-production, with a proven track record of saving productions time and money by eliminating the requirement to perform physical tests on-set until convinced of the final design.
- Lumiere Statuette from the Advanced Imaging Society given to honor FrameForge's technological achievement in the stereoscopic medium, and recognize the significant impact the program has had on the advancement of stereoscopic arts and technologies.
