= Powtoon =

On-line software to create presentations and videos

Powtoon Ltd.
- Company type: Private
- Industry: Internet marketing
- Founded: January 4, 2012; 14 years ago
- Headquarters: London, United Kingdom
- Key people: Ilya Spitalnik (Founder), Daniel Zaturansky (Co-Founder), Sven Hoffman (Co-Founder), Oren Mashkovski (Co-Founder)
- Products: Powtoon Visual Communication Platform. A Web-based video maker and animation software
- Website: https://www.powtoon.com

Powtoon Ltd. is a British company which sells cloud-based animation software (SaaS) for creating animated presentations and animated explainer videos. The name "Powtoon" is a portmanteau of the words "PowerPoint" (trademarked by Microsoft) and "cartoon".

== History ==
Powtoon was founded in January 2012. by Ilya Spitalnik and his colleagues. The company released a beta version in August 2012. In December 2012, Powtoon secured $600,000 investment from Los Angeles–based venture capital firm Startup Minds.

== Product ==
Powtoon is a web-based animation software that allows users to create animated presentations by manipulating pre-created objects, imported images, provided music and user-created voice-overs. Powtoon uses an Apache Flex engine to generate an XML file that can be played in the Powtoon online viewer, exported to YouTube or downloaded as an MP4 file.

Powtoon provides several styles of animated video creation including whiteboard doodles and animated content. A user can apply pre-built backgrounds, scenes, objects, and characters to their work, or a user can choose to customize their content by creating their own diverse characters (diverse here refers to the age, race, ethnicity, and body size of the desired character) and uploading their own images, videos, or audio files.

Powtoon is a software that requires a subscription for use.

== See also ==
- Vyond
