= J Roland Kelly =

American singer-songwriter

- Born: Fayetteville, Arkansas
- Occupations: Screenwriter, director, singer-songwriter
- Years active: 1989–present

J Roland Kelly is an American filmmaker, screenwriter, and singer-songwriter. In 2010 his film Sleeping with Charlie Kaufman was an official selection of the Rome International Film Festival and nominated for a Charles B. Pierce Award.

In 2004 he released an album of spoken word poetry entitled J Roland Kelly, Stop Your Nursing Unless You're Rendering Fun followed by J Roland Kelly Taunts the Process ...into Attacking in 2008, and on January 20, 2009—the last day of the Bush presidency—he released the single J Roland Kelly Marshals Against Karl Rove.

In the promotional lead up to J Roland Kelly, Stop Your Nursing Unless You're Rendering Fun he released a series of short films including Music Video, Billfold, and It Just Happens that Way. This experience led to him reworking a group of short films he made in adolescence to produce Dinosaur! which screened at film festivals in the spring of 2005.

In 2009 after the release of J Roland Kelly Marshals Against Karl Rove he began work on Sleeping with Charlie Kaufman and in an interview with BeingCharlieKaufman.com, J Roland Kelly states that he created the film in homage to Charlie Kaufman because he was inspired by early drafts of Kaufman's screenplays that he himself had read when he first started screenwriting.

In an interview with Xtranormal, J Roland Kelly describes Sleeping with Charlie Kaufman as "...basically this absurd, funny conversation between a guy and his girlfriend. He tells her he fantasizes about her twin sister, but she doesn't have a twin sister, so it's just another way of fantasizing about her… and is she offended. [It draws on] some La Nouvelle Vague & Mumblecore elements from the kind of films I was watching at the time."

Sleeping with Charlie Kaufman held its premiere on June 3, 2010 at the Little Rock Film Festival.

== Filmography ==
- Prison Break (1989)
- A Boy Named Chad (1989)
- Music Video (2004)
- Billfold (2004)
- Just Happens that Way (2004)
- Dinosaur! (2005)
- Sleeping with Charlie Kaufman (2010)

== Discography ==
- J Roland Kelly, Stop Your Nursing Unless You're Rendering Fun (2004)
- J Roland Kelly Taunts the Process ...into Attacking (2008)
- J Roland Kelly Marshals Against Karl Rove (Single) (2009)

== See also ==
- Charlie Kaufman
- Surreal humor
- Mumblecore
- French New Wave
