= Little Rock Film Festival =

Arkansas film festival

- Location: Little Rock, Arkansas, United States
- Language: International
- Website: http://www.littlerockfilmfestival.org

The Little Rock Film Festival (LRFF) was an annual film festival held in Downtown Little Rock, Arkansas each spring. Based in the historic River Market District, home to the William Jefferson Clinton Presidential Library, the Little Rock Film Festival has showcased the best in Narrative, Documentary, and Short films from around the World. It hosts parties, panels, workshops, and youth programs for aspiring filmmakers. The LRFF devotes screenings and programs specifically for Southern and Arkansas films. In 2010, citing prize money, distribution opportunity, and a chance to be a part of a large event, MovieMaker Magazine included the Little Rock Film Festival on its annual list of The Top 25 Film Festivals Worth the Entry Fee.

== History ==
Founded in 2005 by Little Rock natives and documentary filmmakers Brent and Craig Renaud, along with Owen Brainard and Jamie Moses to promote the film industry in Arkansas, the first three years of the Little Rock Film Festival screened more than 250 films from three dozen countries, conducted filmmaking workshops, held panels with industry leaders, and hosted notable actors, directors, and producers from around the globe.

In 2010 the Little Rock Film Festival hired Executive Director and Arkansas native Jack Lofton and programmed many of the most high-profile films at the festival. Under the Renauds' and Lofton's guidance, the festival grew exponentially with more than 25,000 people in attendance and over 100 films screened, with workshops, panels, and parties included over the increased five-day festival. The 2010 LRFF showcased a strong and diverse film lineup from a pool of over 600 film submissions from 30 different countries.

== Little Rock Film Festival Awards & Prizes ==
Official selections compete for awards and cash prizes including the Oxford American Best Southern Film Award w/ $10,000 cash prize, the Charles B. Pierce Award for Best Film “Made in Arkansas,” the Arkansas Times Audience Award, the LRFF Youth! Award, as well as awards for Best Narrative Feature, Best Documentary Feature, Best Short Film, and the Best Arkansas Music Video. Awards presented by the Little Rock Film Festival are known as "Golden Rocks." The festival announces the award winners during the Closing Night Gala and Awards Ceremony held in the William Jefferson Clinton Presidential Library.

== 2007 Little Rock Film Festival ==
Best Feature Film: Offside

Best Documentary Film: Little Birds

Best Short Film: Ein, Zwei Dinge

Best of Arkansas: Where’s My Closeup, Mr. Thornton? (Dir. Tim Jackson)

== 2008 Little Rock Film Festival ==
Best Narrative Feature Film Award: The Promotion (Dir. Steven Conrad)

Best Documentary Feature Film Award: Behind Forgotten Eyes (Dir. Anthony Gilmore)

Best Short Film Award: The Adventure (Dir. Mike Brune)

Charles B. Pierce Filming Arkansas Award: War Eagle, Arkansas (film) (Dir. Robert Milazzo, Pro. Vincent Insalaco, Wri. Graham Gordy)

Best Music Video Award: Like Zombies by The Moving Front. (Dirs. Kevin Stanbury and Bryan Stafford, collectively known as Deluxe36)

Lifetime Achievement Award: Charles B. Pierce

== 2009 Little Rock Film Festival ==
Best Narrative Feature: That Evening Sun (film) (Dir. Scott Teems, Wris. Scott Teems, William Gay (author))

Best Documentary Feature: The Way We Get By (Dir. Aron Gaudet)

Best Short Film: Manual Práctco del Amigo Imaginario (abreviado) (Dir. Ciro Altabás, Wris. Ciro Altabás, Iñigo Díaz-Guardamino)

Charlie B. Pierce Award–Best Film “Made in Arkansas”: Slumberland (Dir. Jarek Kupsc)

Best Arkansas Music Video: Dear Daniel by The Good Fear

Audience Award: Breaking Upwards (Dir. Daryl Wein, Wris. Peter Duchan, Zoe Lister Jones, Daryl Wein)

== 2010 Little Rock Film Festival ==
Golden Rock for Best Narrative Feature Film:

Winter's Bone (Dir. Debra Granik)*

Alamar

Etienne! (Dir. Jeff Mizushima)

Passenger Pigeons (Dir. Martha Stephens)

Legacy (Dir. Thomas Ikimi)

Obselidia (Dir. Dianne Bell)

Tiny Furniture (Dir. Lena Dunham)

Homewrecker (Dirs. Todd Barnes, Brad Barnes)

Arcadia Lost (Dir. Phedon Papamichael)

The Colonel's Bride (Dir. Brent Stewart)

Five Star Day (Dir. Danny Buday)

Black, White, and Blues (Dir. Mario Van Peebles)

Golden Rock for Best Documentary Feature Film:

Restrepo (film) (Dirs. Sebastian Junger and Tim Hetherington)*

Wo Ai Ni (I Love You) Mommy (Dir. Stephanie Wang-Breal)

Beijing Taxi (Dir. Miao Wang)

Contact (Dirs. Bentley Dean, Martin Butler)

How to Fold a Flag (Dirs. Petra Epperlein, Michael Tucker (director))

Camp Victory, Afghanistan (Dir. Carol Dysinger)

Big River Man (Dir. John Maringouin)

American: The Bill Hicks Story (Dirs. Matt Harlock, Paul Thomas)

P-Star Rising (Dir. Gabriel Noble)

The Secret to a Happy Ending: A Documentary about the Drive-By Truckers (Dir. Barr Weissman)

Speaking in Tongues (Dir. Marcia Jarmel, Ken Schneider)

Louder Than a Bomb (Dirs. Greg Jacobs, Jon Siskel)

The Oxford American Best Southern Film Award w/ $10,000 cash prize:

American: The Bill Hicks Story (Dirs. Matt Harlock and Paul Thomas)*

Charles B. Pierce Award for Best Film “Made in Arkansas”:

Antiquities (Dir. Daniel Campbell)*

Lost Dogs (Dir. Hudson Dunlap)

Silent Night (Dir. Warren McCullough)

Looking for Lurch (Dir. Tim Jackson)

The Mount Nebo Chicken Fry (Dir. Frances Titsworth)

Sleepwalker (Dir. Jordan Faulknor)

The Bloodstone Diaries: Sleeper (Dir. Gerry Bruno)

Sleeping with Charlie Kaufman (Dir. J Roland Kelly)

Ouachita Rising (Dir. Brent Williamson)

In Queso Fever: A Movie About Cheese Dip (Dir. Nick Rogers)

Knocked Out? (Dir. Jesse Abdenour)

Crater People (Dir. John Sims)

Rumby in the Jungy (Dirs. Terrell Case, Timothy Lucas Wistrand, Matthew Corey Gattin)

Spanola Pepper Sauce Company (Dir. Ray McKinnon, Graham Gordy)

The Inner Path (Dir. Michael Sutterfield)

Six Feet of Separation (Dir. Kurt Armstrong)

Table at Luigi's (Dir. Joe Dull)

Silent Storytellers (Dir. Hop Litzwire)

Jerry Van Dyke's Arkansas (Dir. Shirley Van Dyke)

Irene (Dir. David Bogard)

Golden Rock for Best Short Film Award:

The Greims (Dir. Peter Bolte)*

Edge of the Desert (Dir. Lea Nakonechny)

Amateur (Dir. Daniel Trevino)

Smog (Dir. Clara Kraft Isono)

The Visitors (Dir. Samina Akbari)

Down In Number 5 (Dir. Kim Spurlock)

Mixtape (Dir. Luke Snellin)

Little Ripper (Dir. Jarrod Boord)

She's a Fox (Dir. Cameron Sawyer)

Maneki Neko (Dir. German Talavera)

Context (Dirs. Rice, Kimberly)

Shadows In the Wind (Dir. Julia Guillen-Creagh)

Fancy (Dir. Chris "C.K." Olsen)

Goin' Nowhere Fast (Dir. Shawn Adams)

The Architect (Dir. Joshua Demers)

Dacil (Dir. Adrian Silvestre)

A Pattern of Prophecies: an adaptation of Shakespeare's Macbeth (Dir. Laurel Petty)

History of Made Up Things (Dir. Ashley Eberbach)

The Mount Nebo Chicken Fry (Dir. Frances Titsworth)

Sleepwalker (Dir. Jordan Faulknor)

The Bloodstone Diaries: Sleeper (Dir. Gerry Bruno)

Sleeping with Charlie Kaufman (Dir. J Roland Kelly)

Ouachita Rising (Dir. Brent Williamson)

In Queso Fever: A Movie About Cheese Dip (Dir. Nick Rogers)

Knocked Out? (Dir. Jesse Abdenour)

Crater People (Dir. John Sims)

Pini Banini's Razor (Dir. Dan Chapman)

Mr Lewis (Dir. Louisa Fielden)

Junko's Shamisen (Dir. Solomon Friedman)

Red Light (Dir. Shaune Harrison)

Skylight (Dir. David Baas)

Sapsucker (Dir. Christopher Holmes)

Reign of Death (Dir. Matthew Savage)

Road To Moloch (Dir. Robert Glickert)

Oro Verde (Green Gold) (Dir. Estela Roberta)

Sanchez Solitary/Release (Dir. Holden Abigail Osborne)

Bout That Bout (Dir. Nico Sabenorio)

Pillars of Hope (Dir. Edmund "Mumbo" Prince)

Arkansas Best Music Video Award:

Angelene and the Alpha Ray (Dir. David Fowlkes)*

Arkansas Times Audience Award Winner:

Looking for Lurch (Dir. Tim Jackson)*

LRFF Youth! Award:

Outside the Lines (Dir. Fayetteville High School (Arkansas))*

LRFF Youth! Spirit Award:

Will Sondheim*

== See also ==
- List of film festivals in North and Central America
