= Infogram =

Data visualization tool

- Type: Infographics
- License: Free & paid subscriptions
- Website: infogram.com

Infogram is a web-based data visualization and infographics platform, created in Riga, Latvia.

It allows people to make and share digital charts, infographics and maps. Infogram offers an intuitive WYSIWYG editor that converts users’ data into infographics that can be published, embedded or shared. Users do not need coding skills to use this tool; users include newsrooms, marketing teams, governments, educators and students.

The company that created Infogram, also called Infogram, was founded in 2012 in Riga, Latvia and has another office in San Francisco. As of October 2017, Infogram says it has 3 million users who have created charts and infographics that have been viewed more than 1.5 billion times.

Infogram was bought by Prezi, a web-based presentation software company, in May 2017.

== History ==
Infogram was founded in February 2012 in Riga, Latvia by Uldis Leiterts, Raimonds Kaže and Alise Dīrika.

In January 2013, Infogram won the international Hy Berlin pitch contest. During his pitch, Infogram CEO Uldis Leiterts announced that the company had created more templates and was working with Microsoft to integrate its platform with the contemporaneous version of Microsoft Office.

The company also won the 2013 Kantar Information Is Beautiful Award, which “celebrates excellence and beauty in data visualizations, infographics, interactives & information art.”

In December 2014, Infogram acquired the Brazil-based data visualization blog, Visualoop.

In an effort to expand sales and marketing in the U.S., Infogram secured $1.8 million in funding in February 2014. The announcement was made at TechChill, a startup conference for the Baltics in Riga, Latvia. At the time, the funding was believed to be the largest to date for the company.

Infogram won the 2017 National Design Award of Latvia.

== Acquisition by Prezi ==
Prezi, a web-based presentation software company, acquired Infogram in May 2017. Infogram is now a wholly owned subsidiary of Prezi.

Infogram was rated #1 on Forbes’ list of “The Best Infographic Tools for 2017,” which was published in September 2017.

In October 2017, Infogram announced a new version of its data visualization platform, including a drag-and-drop editor, over 40 new designer templates and social media support.

== See also ==
- Infogram examples
- Infographics
- Data visualization
- Chart
- Data-driven journalism
