= Ádám Somlai-Fischer =

Hungarian architect, artist and entrepreneur

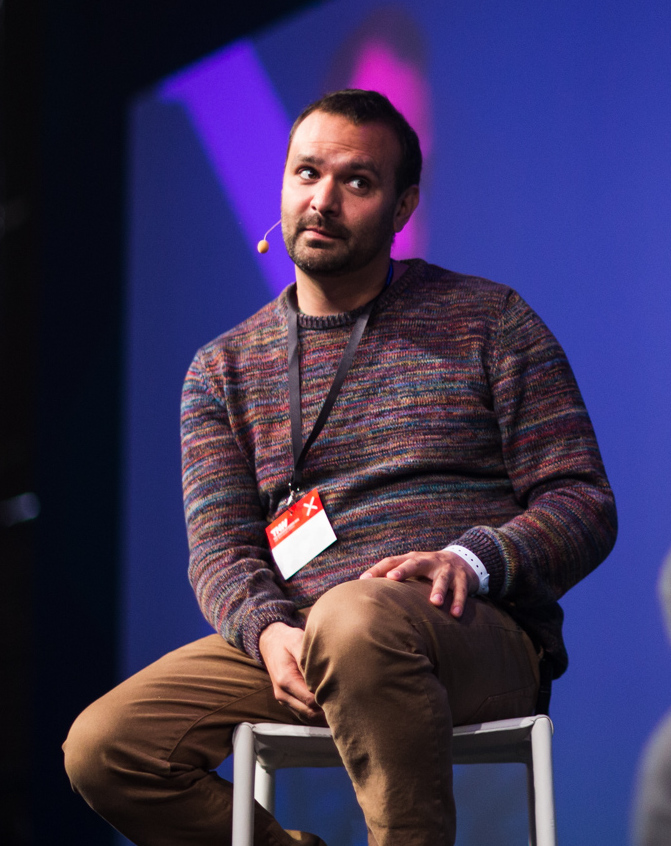
Ádám Somlai-Fischer, 2015

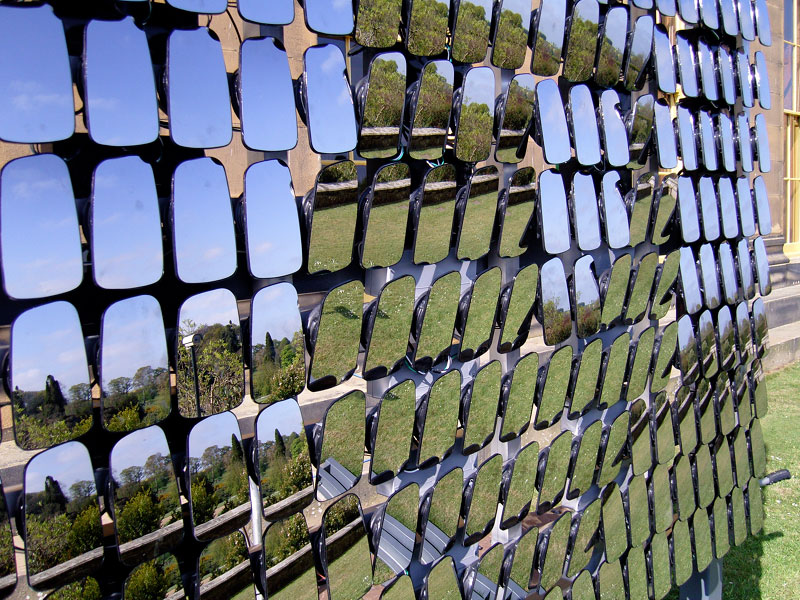
Ádám Somlai-Fischer "Aleph" project in Belsay Hall, UK. Aleph is constructing stories from fragments it finds around itself.

Ádám (Szabolcs) Somlai-Fischer, born 1976 in Budapest, is an architect and interaction designer. He is also the co-founder and Principal Artist of Prezi and creates installations and experiments that blend spaces, technologies and interactivity. In 2007 Somlai-Fischer co-founded "Kitchen Budapest medialab" where he worked as the program director until 2009, since then he remained a key advisor of the lab.

Somlai-Fischer lectures and conducts workshops in architecture and design schools across Europe. He graduated from the Architecture + Urban Research Laboratory, KTH, Stockholm, taught at the Architecture and Media technology departments at KTH, working as a guest researcher at the Smart p studio (now Interactive Institute in Stockholm). He was guest researcher at the MOKK Media Research and held workshops in design schools such as Domus Academy, Milan and Goldsmith College, London. He is directing "aether architecture", an office for mediated environments based in Budapest.

== Important works ==
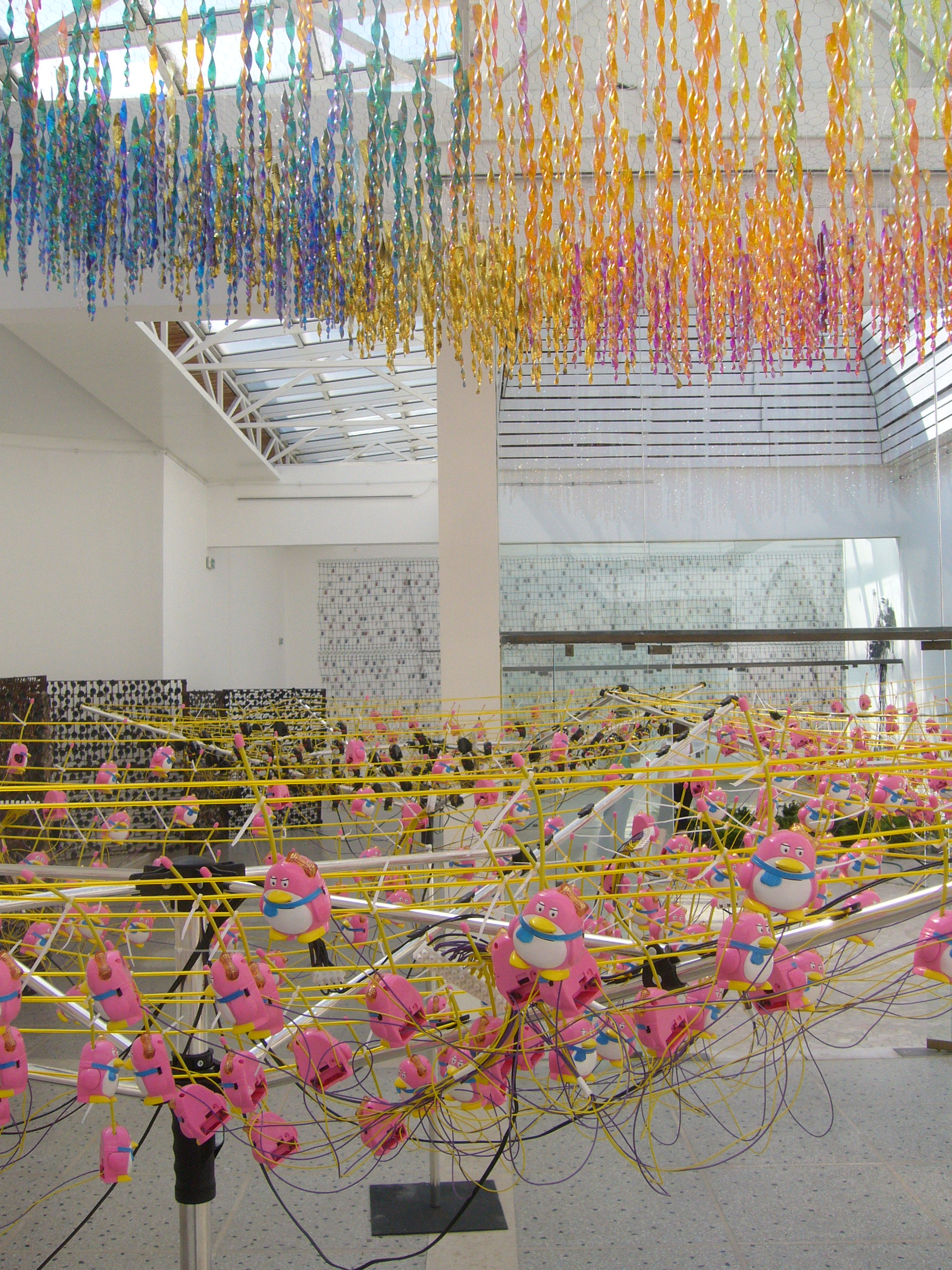
"ReOrient" 10th Venice Biennale of Architecture Hungarian Pavilion. Architectural experience built from thousands of functioning networked Chinese toys...

Examples include Reorient - a space made of thousands of electronic toys, Ping Genius Loci - a field of outdoor analogue pixels, Brainmirror - a mixed reality experience presenting MRI through a mirror, Low Tech Sensors and Actuators workshop and handbook, and Induction house - a set of experiments for spatial projections. These projects were shown at the Venice Biennale of Architecture 2004, 2006, ISEA 2004 Helsinki and 2006 San Jose, Ars Electronica 2006, Kiasma Museum Helsinki, Ludwig Museum Budapest, China International New Media Arts Exhibition 2008, NTT ICC Tokyo.

== Interests ==
=== Horizontal collaboration ===
One of his main principle is that the idea, the project is the center of the action. Therefore, there is not one author, nor authority and novelty is not a major preoccupation even if every project, in its practical existence requires a lot of creativity and invention: not creating technologies but inventing creative usages of recent technologies, often through hacking and hybridization. The product of the collaborative process in the architecture realm is therefore more oriented toward the culture quality, embodying technology as culture. When authorship is involved with identified individuals, Bengt Sjölén, Usman Haque, Tamas Szakal, Massimo Banzi, Peter Halacsy, Peter Hudini, Andras Kangyal, Attila Nemes, Anita Pozna can be picked as recurrent collaborators. Peer production (coined within social sciences) in a "controlled environment like Kitchen Budapest created the necessity of a work methodology : throwing ideas, and a collectively agreed distributing of time, "60% own personal project, 35% someone else's project, 5% practical collective tasks)". The work of Adam Somlai-Fischer in the Kitchen Budapest is more than to identify areas of interest and organise the dynamics as groups of work : "Mobile expression", "Networked things", "DIY media, intergang", "Toy hack space", "wireless city"... In every project he admits everyone has his/her own goals and satisfaction factors. For him the individual identity can be blurred in the community, but it is precisely the belonging to a community, even as a part of a loose network, that individual identity can emerge stronger.

=== Sharing ===
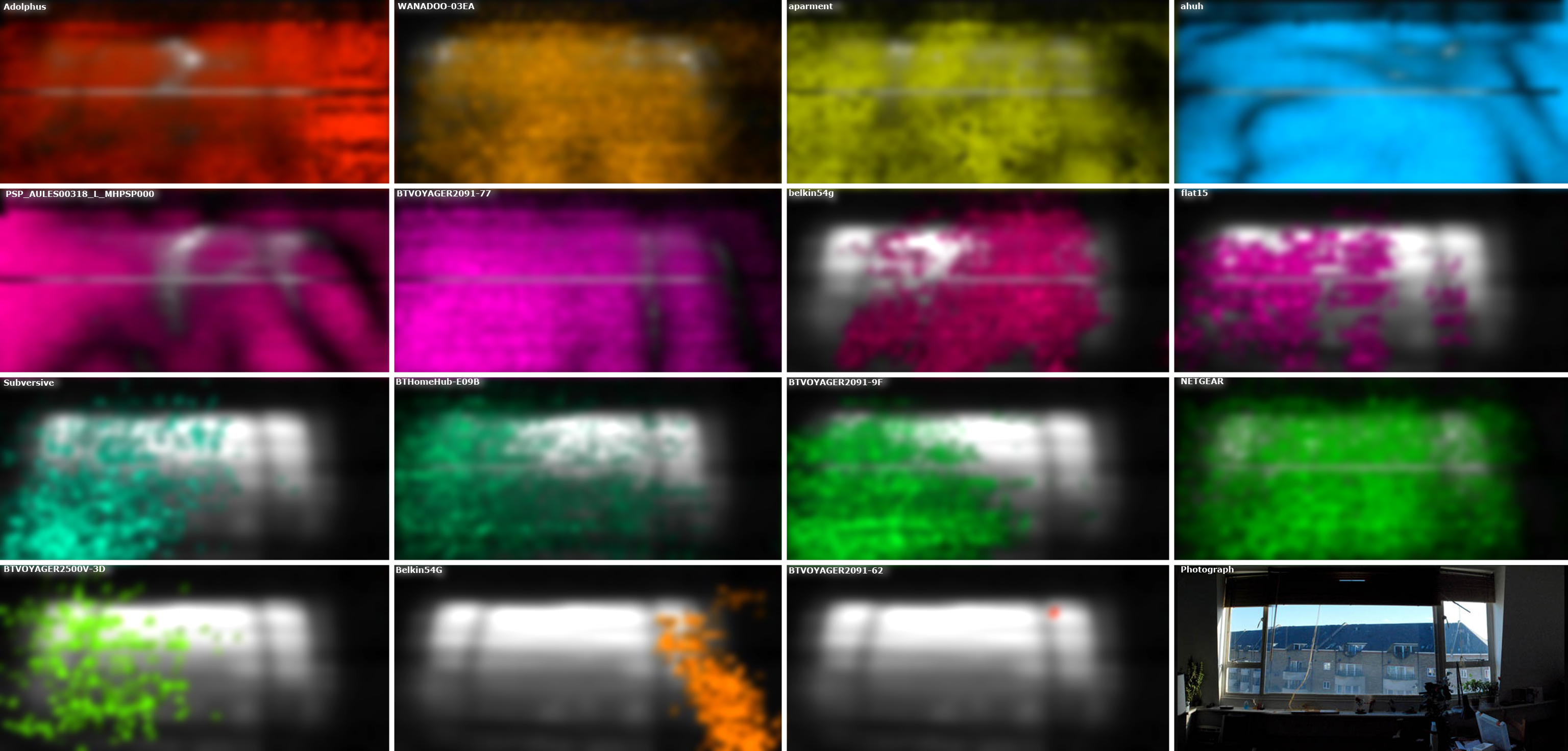
Wifi Camera reveals the electromagnetic space of devices and the shadows created within such spaces.

In his lectures instead of presenting an ideology or methodology he presents projects and invites the audience to contribute. He organises hands-on workshops to lectures focusing on open hardware and interaction design, some texts, and unrealized concepts. On his website you can download samples of software, texts and ideas, but no manifesto.

=== Goals ===
In 2008 at the Royal College of Art Adam Somlai-Fischer declared his goals are:

- openness;
- the capacity of an architectural of design work to be writable, to diversify, to allow people to reconfigure and appropriate the object (Mass customization?); and
- in the abstract, a quest for freedom in the technological society.
