= Prezi =

Online presentation design platform

- Website type: Presentation Collaboration
- Available in: English, Portuguese, Spanish, Korean, Japanese, German, Italian, French, Hungarian
- Headquarters: San Francisco, United States; Budapest, Hungary
- Owner: Prezi Inc
- Founders: Adam Somlai-Fischer; Peter Halacsy; Peter Arvai
- Employees: 300 (2022)
- Website: www.prezi.com
- Launched: April 5, 2009; 17 years ago
- Current status: Active

Prezi (short form of prezentáció in Hungarian, lit. 'presentation') is a presentation software company founded in 2009 in Budapest. As of 2025, they have more than 160 million users worldwide who have created approximately 400 million presentations. In 2019, they launched Prezi Video, a tool that allows for virtual presentations within the video screen of a live or recorded video.

== History ==
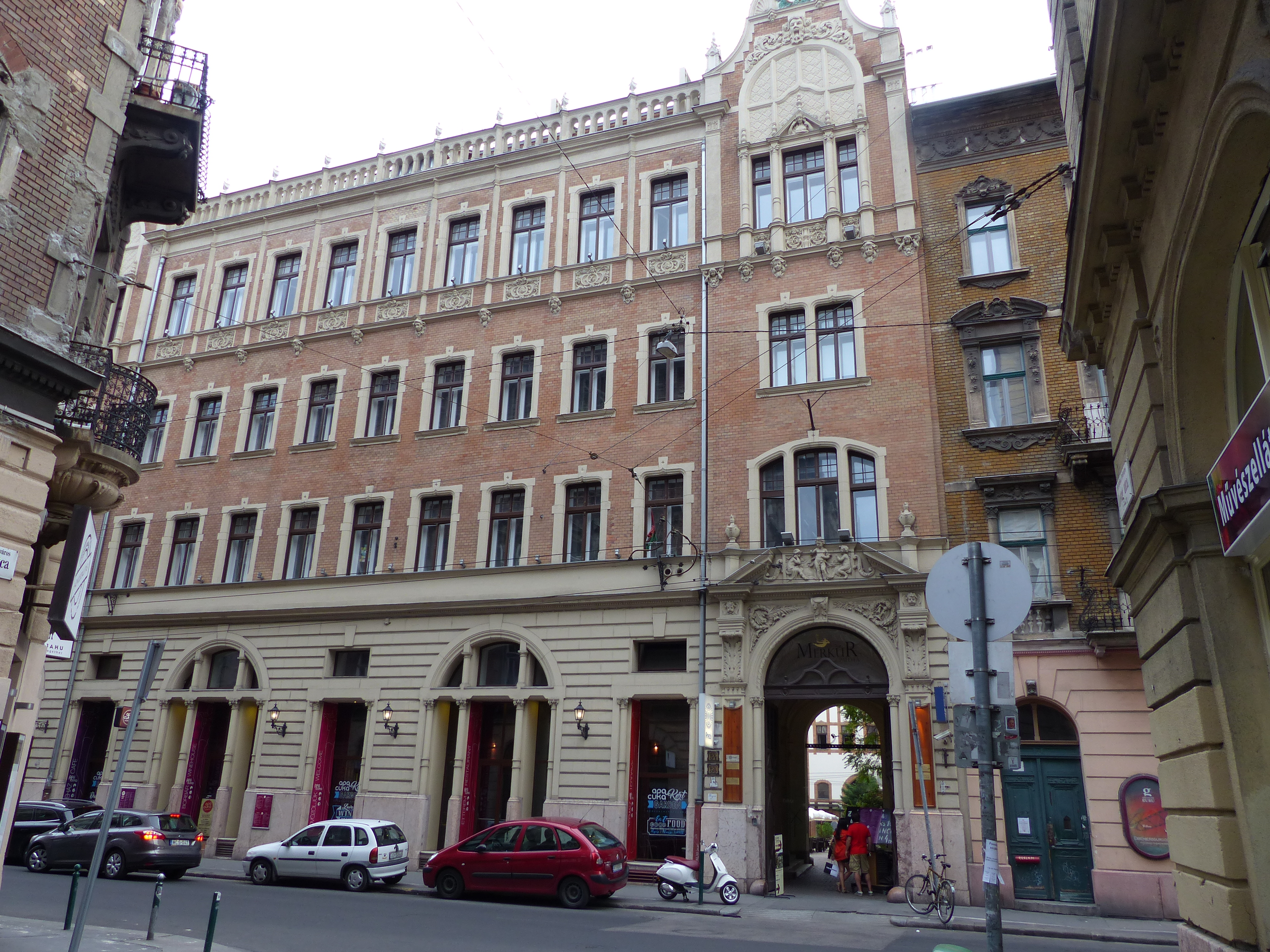
The building housing the Prezi offices in Budapest (2016)

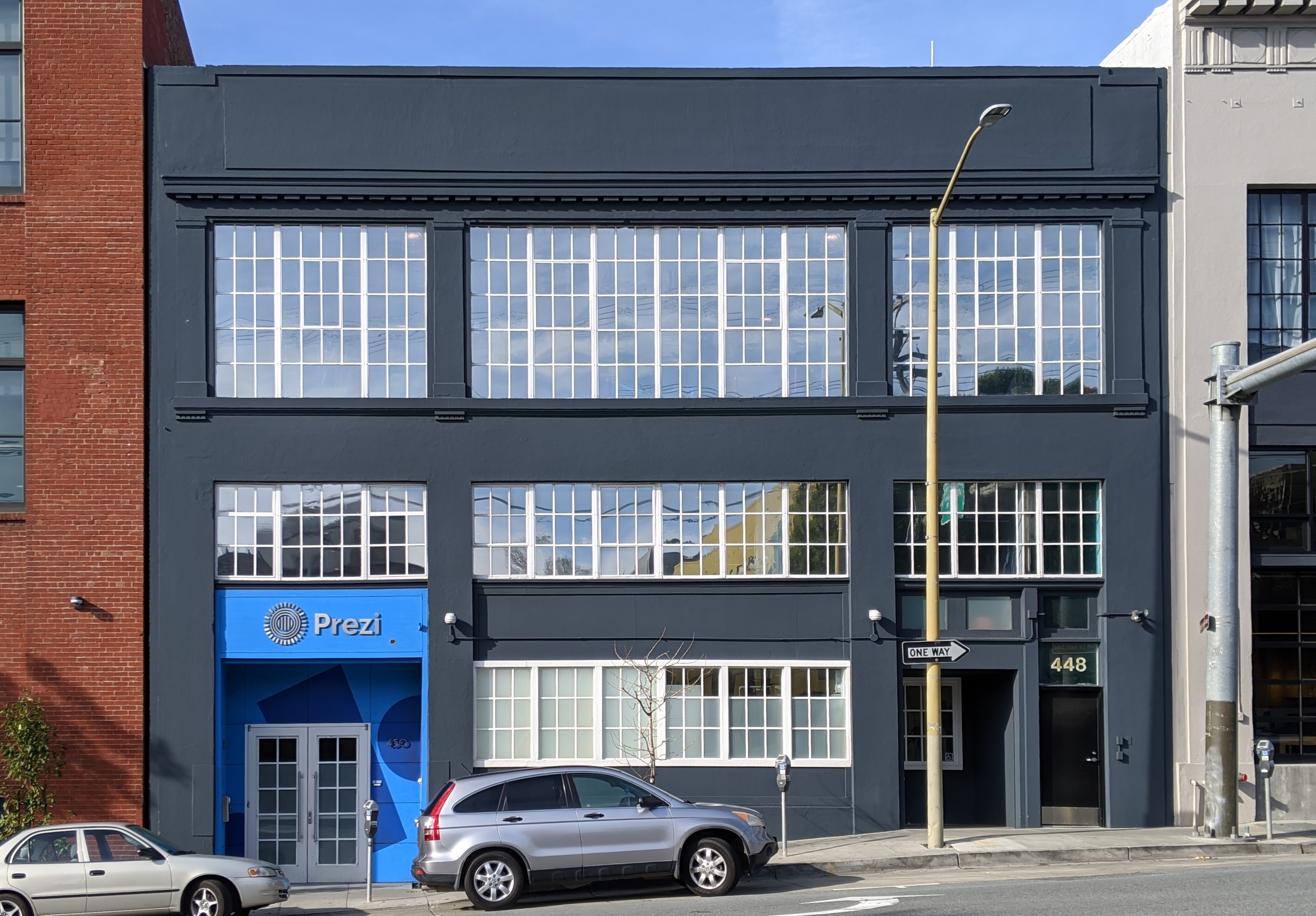
Prezi offices in San Francisco (2020)

Prezi was founded in 2009 in Budapest, Hungary, by Adam Somlai-Fischer, Peter Halacsy, and Peter Arvai. The company incorporated on May 20, 2009, and received its first major investment from TED two months later. In November 2009, a San Francisco office was opened.

In early 2011, Prezi launched its first iPad application. That same year, it received $14M in Series B venture capital funding led by Accel Partners. A Prezi iPhone app was launched in late 2012.

In March 2014, Prezi pledged $100 million in free licenses to Title 1 schools as part of the Obama administration's ConnectED program. November of that year saw the announcement of $57 million in new funding from Spectrum Equity and Accel Partners.

In February 2015, Prezi launched Nutshell, an app for creating 'mini-movies' from photos. Prezi for Android was launched in 2015, and in June 2016, the company launched Prezi Business which combines the core features of Prezi Present with business-focused productivity tools, including real-time data analytics, integration with the business collaboration platform Slack, commenting and co-editing features, and the Live Prezi feature, with virtual meeting rooms for hosting remote Prezi presentations.

In April 2017, Prezi Next—a new HTML5-based product—was released. In May 2017, Prezi acquired Infogram, a data visualization company based in Latvia.

In 2017, Prezi started to observe a shift from presentations being primarily onstage and in-person, to increased virtual presenting, and the company began a broader effort to refocus around improving virtual meetings and integrating into virtual communications tools.

In 2019, Prezi renamed the flagship platform, Prezi Next, to Prezi Present to better position themselves as the best visual storytelling software alternative to traditional slide-based presentation formats. Prezi presentations offer an open canvas format that allows presenters to emphasize key ideas through their zooming feature. An update to the original Prezi presentation software features a redesigned editor, designer templates, and Prezi Viewer for Android and iOS devices. Additionally, Prezi Present makes it possible to use augmented reality in presentations.

In November 2019, Prezi launched Prezi Video, a video tool that lets users give virtual presentations in the screen of a live or recorded video, enabling video presenters to interact with their visual content like a newscaster or weather-person. Users can leverage Prezi Video in a live meeting or create recorded videos, allowing the presenter to maintain a face-to-face connection with their audience. Prezi Video is integrated with popular video chat platforms and communication tools; it can be used in Zoom, Microsoft Teams, Google Hangouts, Slack, Facebook, GoToWebinar and Webex.

Teachers were the quickest audience to adopt Prezi Video, and by April 2020 Prezi had teachers in 175 countries using Prezi Video in their virtual classrooms. Prezi Video received a 2020 Award of Excellence from Tech & Learning Magazine. Steven M. Baule and Julie E. Lewis state that "making a Prezi video is fairly simple", and that the "presentation engine is robust and allows for embedded video from YouTube or other sources".

That same year, they launched Prezi Design, a cloud-based graphic design tool that can be used to make professional-looking charts, reports, maps, infographics, and more. It has since had a name change to Infographics.

In July 2020, Prezi named President Jim Szafranski as the new CEO, and announced that co-founder and CEO Peter Arvai would become executive chairman. Szafranski joined Prezi as chief operating officer in 2015 and was named to the board of directors in 2018, before being elevated to president in 2019.

In 2024, Prezi introduced Prezi AI, a tool designed to assist users in generating presentations using artificial intelligence. The feature uses AI to help organize and design presentations based on user-provided content, continuing Prezi's approach of non-linear presentation formats. Unlike traditional slide-based software, Prezi AI emphasizes a more dynamic and adaptive layout style.

== Uses ==
The platform has been used in the conference setting by the Clinton Foundation, Lufthansa, IBM, and The Independent, and is a staple at both SXSW and TED. Prezi Business is designed specifically for sales and marketing professionals. The platform combines conversational presenting capabilities with business-focused features such as collaboration, Slack integration, and analytics. Prezi worked closely with the ConnectED initiative since its inauguration by President Barack Obama in 2013, providing free Prezi licenses to hundreds of thousands of Title I high school teachers across the USA. It has also been used for creative purposes, such as Alexandra Saemmer's digital poem Böhmische Dörfer.

In 2022, Prezi was recognized as a recipient of the 2022 Zoom Partner Awards from Zoom Video Communications, Inc., commending the company's impactful achievements in enabling 'on-screen' content for more engaging video meetings. The award was presented to Prezi for the Integrated Software Vendor (ISV) Integration Partner of the Year at Zoomtopia Partner Connect.

Prezi is widely used by businesses, educators, and professionals across various industries.
