= Vyond =

American animated video creation platform

GoAnimate, Inc.
- Logo used since May 6, 2018
- Type: Private
- Traded as: GoAnimate (2007–2018); Vyond (2018–present)
- Industry: Software
- Founded: 2007; 19 years ago
- Founder: Alvin Hung
- Headquarters: 2 East 3rd Avenue, San Mateo, California, United States
- Key people: Scott Ernst (CEO)
- Services: Video production
- Website: www.vyond.com

GoAnimate, Inc., doing business as Vyond since 2018, is an American privately held software company based in San Mateo, California. Founded in 2007 by Alvin Hung, the company operates a paid cloud-based animation video creation platform oriented towards businesses, enterprises and educators, including an animated video maker known as Vyond Studio (formerly GoAnimate), the company's flagship and most-well-known product and an evolution of the company's original Flash-based video maker, and an AI-powered instant video maker known as Vyond Go.

== History ==
GoAnimate was founded as an animation software company in 2007 by Alvin Hung, and the first version of its then-namesake animation platform was launched in mid-2008.

In May 2009, DomoAnimate was launched. This program allowed users to create GoAnimations based on the Domo shorts. On September 15, 2014, the DomoAnimate site closed down and was later redirected to the GoAnimate for Schools website.

In March 2011, GoAnimate, along with Stupeflix Video Maker and Xtranormal Movie Maker, became the founding partners of YouTube Create, a suite of apps available to content creators within YouTube, resulting in an increase in popularity. This suite added more apps later on but was eventually discontinued in early 2013.

In 2011, GoAnimate opened an office in San Francisco. In late August 2011, a school-safe version of GoAnimate featuring dedicated privacy, security, content moderation and group management features, known as GoAnimate for Schools, publicly launched. In October 2011, a custom set of characters based on candidates from the 2012 United States presidential election was released.

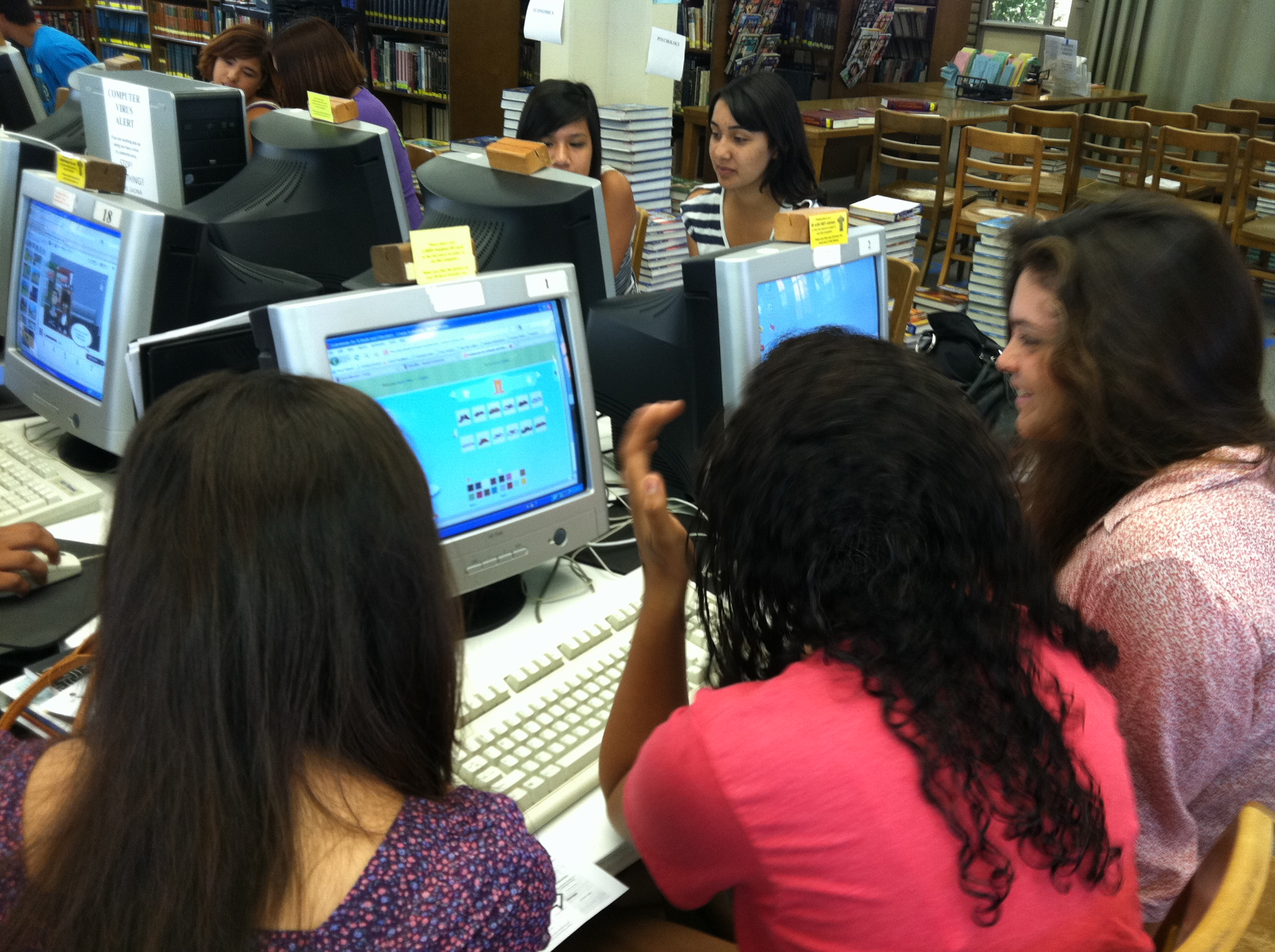
People using GoAnimate in a library's computer lab

On March 1, 2012, GoAnimate launched the Business Friendly theme, the first of the five "business themes" on the site. In April 2012, the first business-oriented subscription plans were publicly launched. These included 1080p download, watermark removal and replacement, and new business-oriented visual themes. These plans led to increased popularity and exposure for GoAnimate.

By July 2013, over ten million videos had been created using the GoAnimate platform.

On September 16, 2013, GoAnimate slightly modified its logo, removing the exclamation mark. That same day, the site relaunched with a new user interface, along with the removal of GoBucks and GoPoints.

Logo for Go!Animate used from November 1, 2007, to September 15, 2013

Logo for GoAnimate used from September 16, 2013, to May 5, 2018

At the end of 2013, the "paper cutout" assets of explainer video pioneer Common Craft were integrated into GoAnimate as a new visual theme. In April 2014, multi-seat business subscription plans were launched, including full-featured administrative tools along with group collaboration and review. Around the same time, GoAnimate also released their next Business theme, that being Whiteboard Animation, and a publishing integration with e-learning courseware authoring platform Lectora.

On November 25, 2014, GoAnimate discontinued their free plan, which had limited features, replacing it with a trial plan that lasts 14 days. After a user's subscription expires, the user must subscribe to a paid plan to create or edit videos. All free plan accounts expired on November 25, 2015, a year after they discontinued their free plan. By the end of 2015, the company had over 50 employees.

By the end of 2014, GoAnimate's library contained over 10,000 assets, including a new set of Supreme Court justices and settings. In 2015, the company opened an office in Taiwan, making it GoAnimate's third location (after Hong Kong and San Francisco).

In May 2015, GoAnimate announced future expansion plans including going public, but there had been no decision on the listing venue. Around mid-2015, social network features such as favorites, comments and messages were removed as GoAnimate shifted its focus more on businesses and marketing.

A comparison of an older GoAnimate character made in Comedy World (left) and a current Vyond character made in Contemporary (right)

On October 19, 2015, it was announced that GoAnimate would migrate from Adobe Flash to HTML5 animation, which allows mobile device compatibility. In that same announcement, it was also announced that the older, less technological-adaptable themes (or non-business themes) such as Lil' Peepz, Comedy World, Anime, Stick Figure, Cartoon Classics, and others would be retired on January 5, 2016, as they were incompatible with HTML5. GoAnimate for Schools, however, retained Adobe Flash and the non-business themes until July 26, 2016.

On March 31, 2016, VoiceForge voices were removed from GoAnimate and GoAnimate for Schools.

On May 6, 2018, the GoAnimate platform was renamed Vyond after the company had revealed its launching to occur at an exhibition in San Diego a day later. The developer of Vyond remains as "GoAnimate, Inc."

On May 6, 2019, Vyond announced the retirement of the legacy video maker in December 2019 due to support for Adobe Flash ending on December 31, 2020. All user accounts defaulted to Vyond Studio on August 14, 2019.

On May 3, 2023, Vyond announced Vyond Go, an artificial intelligence-based feature in the video maker that generates videos based on user-provided prompts, similar to ChatGPT. The first public beta was released on June 28, 2023, and is accessible to all users. However, it can only be used 3 times every 24 hours.

In September 2023, Vyond announced that the Oddcast voices would be removed from its platform the following month.

As of August 17, 2024, in the Free Trial version, users can only make 3 videos up to 3 minutes in duration.

In March 2026, Vyond introduced Storybook as its fourth major animation style, joining the existing Business Friendly, Whiteboard Animation, and Contemporary themes. The Storybook theme features a hand-drawn, illustrated aesthetic designed for creative storytelling in corporate and educational settings. Simultaneously, the style was fully integrated into the Vyond Character Creator, allowing users to customize characters with specific Storybook-styled clothing, facial features, and body types.

== Product ==
Vyond's flagship product, Vyond Studio, encompasses a library containing tens of thousands of pre-animated assets, which can be controlled through a drag and drop interface. Asset types include characters, actions, templates, props, text boxes, music tracks, and sound effects. Users can also upload their own assets, such as audio files, image files, or video files. There is also a drag and drop composition tool, which users can employ to create pans and zooms. Spoken dialogue and narration can be recorded directly into the platform or imported as an audio file. Characters can automatically lip-sync the dialogue that is assigned to them. Alternatively, audio can be set as voiceover narration. Users can download their finished videos as MP4 files, GIFs, or video presentations.

Another version of Vyond was also available, called GoAnimate for Schools. On April 10, 2018, Vyond announced that GoAnimate for Schools would be shutting down on June 30, 2019. On that same day, the 14-day free trial was removed from the schools site. Subscription purchases and renewals on GoAnimate for Schools were removed on May 6, 2018, with product support and service officially terminating on June 30, 2019.

Vyond also provides Vyond Go, an artificial intelligence based feature that automatically generates videos from prompts by users.

In 2024, the Android app was launched.

== Usage ==
A 2014 Journal of Management Education article described GoAnimate as "the leading software for individuals, organizations and educational users to develop and disseminate animated video". As of March 2024, Vyond has over 20,000 customers, including 65% of Fortune 500 companies.

Vyond is commonly used by businesses for marketing and corporate education. GoAnimate for Schools was previously promoted as a way to make lessons more interesting through animation and for students to bring their stories to life. Vyond has also been used to create online fan-made parodies of cartoon shows and video games. Researchers of children's media have noted that young viewers encounter fan-produced Caillou videos animated with GoAnimate, illustrating the software's circulation in youth media consumption alongside official children's content.

In 2022, Vyond temporarily became unavailable for users from Russia and Russian-occupied territories.
