= Muvizu =

MuvizuPlay is an animation software package based on the Unreal Engine 3 developed by the UK-based company Digimania (formerly knowns as the DA Group), whose earlier work includes the virtual newsreader Ananova.

Muvizu was known as Muvizu 3D during the beta release cycles and was rebranded as Muvizu Play upon the 1.0 release in April 2013.

The software is aimed at people who wish to make 3-D animations without using expensive software packages and without specialist training. It is a popular tool for educational purposes. Muvizu has a wide variety of content producers, from single amateur users to professional studios, such as Zubox, who create shows such as The Football Special, which is broadcast on MSN.

MuvizuPlay is pre-packed with a variety of two-legged characters, objects, effects and pre-made animations which users can use to fit their own stories. The software also supports custom objects, character textures, object textures, dialogue (including the ability to lip-sync automatically) and sound effects allowing a wide variety of customisation. One of its key features is its extremely quick production cycle – it is possible to have a fully voiced and animated video ready for upload within a couple of hours. When Rafa Benitez was confirmed as the manager of Chelsea F.C. in 2012 the script, voice recording and animation were completed five hours before the actual press conference. Users have also been able to produce relatively simple videos in as little as 20 minutes.

== Muvizu productions ==
There have been a wide variety of videos made using the Muvizu package, but the most widely known commercial videos are The Football Special and Ghost House.

== Commercial use ==
Muvizu:Play can be downloaded and used free of charge. The videos it produces are watermarked with the Muvizu logo. Watermarked videos may not be used for commercial reasons. To earn money from Muvizu videos, users must pay to remove the watermark. An in-app purchase process allows the removal of the watermark and gives full commercial rights for that video allowing it to be sold, used for business and to attach YouTube adverts to it. On 7 October 2013, Digimania announced a new paid version of Muvizu called Muvizu:Play+. It can be purchased for £24.99 and allows for unlimited watermark free renders, thus allowing for unlimited commercial use.

== System requirements ==
As Muvizu is based on the Unreal 3 engine it has relatively high minimum specifications and as such users may have to upgrade their machines before use. There is no current version of Muvizu which works on Linux or Mac OS X, so in order to use it users must have a Windows installation on their machine, which can be done via bootcamp on Apple Macs.

The minimum specifications for are:

OS: Windows XP, Window 7, Window 8, Window 8.1
Processor: Intel Core2 Duo 2.4 GHz, AMD Athlon X2 2.8 GHz
Memory: 2GB RAM
Graphics: A shader model 3.0 compliant card, such as Nvidia GeForce 7800GTS or ATI Radeon X1800
DirectX: 9.0c
Hard drive: 2 GB HD space
Sound: DirectX compatible

The recommended specifications are:

OS: Windows 7 -64bit
Processor: Intel Quad Core i5/i7 or AMD Athlon II X4
Memory: 8 GB RAM
Graphics: NVIDIA GeForce GTX 460 / ATI Radeon HD 5850 (Shader Model 3.0 compatible with 1GB of RAM)
DirectX: 11
Hard drive: 2 GB HD space
Sound: DirectX Compatible (Surround Sound 5.1 capable)

Note that it may lag if using the minimum specifications.
