= List of Flash animated television series =

The software's logo since 2020

This is a list of Flash animated television series consists animated TV series produced in Adobe Animate (formerly Adobe Flash Professional, Macromedia Flash, and FutureSplash Animator). It is organized by the year of release.

== Pre-1990 ==
Name	Network	Demographic	Country	Year released	Original broadcast	Production	Technique used	Notes
Monica's Gang	Cartoon Network Brazil	Children	Brazil	1976	December 24, 1976 – present		switched to Flash around season 13 and switched to Toon Boom Harmony in season 23	

== 1990s ==
Name	Network	Demographic	Country	Year Released	Original Broadcast	Production	Technique Used	Notes
Beavis and Butt-Head	MTV, Paramount+	Adult	United States	1993	March 8, 1993 – present		used cel animation around season 1, then switch to Toonz around season 2 and switched to Adobe Animate around season 9	combines animation with live action and animated by Rough Draft Korea (season 1–season 8) and Titmouse, Inc. (season 9–present)
Space Ghost Coast to Coast	TNT, TBS, Cartoon Network, Adult Swim, GameTap	Adult	United States	1994	April 15, 1994 – May 31, 2008		switched to Flash around season 4, combines animation with live action	spin-off of Space Ghost
Cartoon Planet	Cartoon Network	Children	United States	1995	September 10, 1995 – February 8, 2014		switched to Flash around season 2	spin-off of Space Ghost Coast to Coast
Arthur	PBS Kids	Children	Canada, United States	1996	October 7, 1996 – February 21, 2022		used Toonz around season 1, then switched to Flash in season 16 and switched to Toon Boom in season 20	combines animation with live action
Blazing Dragons	Teletoon, Toon Disney, Nickelodeon, YTV	Children	Canada, United Kingdom	1996	September 9, 1996 – June 20, 1998	Nelvana, Ellipse Animation	The show was animated traditionally with ToonBoom for digital ink-and-paint	Animated by Hanho Heung-Up Co., Ltd., Studios Animage and Le Studio Ellipse
KaBlam!	Nickelodeon	Children	United States	1996	October 11, 1996 – May 27, 2000		used ToonBoom around season 1, then switched to Flash around season 2	spin-off of All That, combines animation with live action
Caillou	Teletoon, Treehouse TV	Preschool	Canada	1997	September 15, 1997 – October 3, 2010		used Pegs'n Co/Toonz around season 2, then switched to Flash around season 4 and switched to Toon Boom around season 5	
Stickin' Around	YTV	Children	Canada	1997	January 20 – December 8, 1997	Nelvana	used Flash in Season 2 only; seasons 1 and 3 were traditionally animated using ToonBoom	animated by Wang Film Productions (season 1), Bardel Entertainment (season 2), Hanho Heung-Up Co., Ltd. (season 3)
The Goddamn George Liquor Program	Spumco.com	Adult	United States	1997	October 15, 1997 – 1998		used Macromedia Flash, Adobe After Effects, and Adobe Photoshop	first Flash adult animated internet series
64 Zoo Lane	CBeebies	Preschool	United Kingdom, France	1999	February 18, 1999 – February 28, 2013		used Pegs'n Co/ToonBoom around season 1, then switched to Flash around season 3	
Home Movies	UPN, Adult Swim	Adult	United States	1999	April 26, 1999 – April 4, 2004		used Squigglevision in season 1 and switched to Flash around season 2	
A Little Curious	HBO Family	Preschool	United States	1999	February 1, 1999 – May 1, 2000	Curious Pictures		combines animation, and live-action
Family Guy	Fox	Adult	United States	1999	January 31, 1999 – present		Seasons 1 to 7 were animated traditionally in digital ink-and-paint; starting in season 8 the show uses ToonBoom	
Angela Anaconda	Teletoon, Fox Kids	Children	Canada	1999	October 4, 1999 – November 29, 2001		Used mixed in cutout animation and flash animation	
Little Bill	Nickelodeon	Preschool	United States	1999	November 28, 1999 – February 6, 2004		Used mixed in cutout animation and flash animation	
The Big Knights	BBC Two, Nickelodeon, YTV	Children	United States, United Kingdom	1999	December 19, 1999 – January 3, 2000		Animated in CelAction 2D	

== 2000s ==
Title	Country	Year	Notes and technique used
Marvin the Tap-Dancing Horse	Canada	2000–2002	The show was animated traditionally with ToonBoom for digital-ink-and-paint
Weekend Pussy Hunt	United States	2000	
Gary the Rat	United States	2000	
Queer Duck	United States	2000–2004	
Happy Tree Friends	United States	2000–2026	
X-Chromosome	United States	2000	"Breakup Girl"
Ollie's Under The Bed Adventures	Canada	2001	Teletoon half-hour special that served as the pilot for Olliver's Adventures
John Callahan's Quads!	Canada	2001–2002	
Xiao Xiao	China	2001–2002	first Flash animated Chinese internet series for adults.
Aaagh! It's the Mr. Hell Show!	Canada, United Kingdom	2001–2002	
2020	Spain	2002	
Home Movies	United States	2002–2004	used Squigglevision in season 1 and switched to Flash around season 2
Max & Ruby	Canada	2002–2019	switched to Toon Boom Harmony in season 6.
¡Mucha Lucha!	United States	2002–2005	
Daft Planet	Canada	2002	
Olliver's Adventures	Canada	2002–2005	
Doodlez	Canada	2002–2004	
Yakkity Yak	Australia, Canada	2002–2003	
Bobinogs	Wales	2002	
Chilly Beach	Canada	2003–2008	
Odd Job Jack	Canada	2003–2007	
Hey Joel	United States	2003	
Jacob Two-Two	Canada	2003–2006	
Princess Natasha	United States	2003-2006	
Megaliga MTV dos VJs Paladinos	Brazil	2003–2007	
Avenida Cartum	Brazil	2003–present	
Harvey Birdman, Attorney at Law	United States	2004–2007	switched to Flash around season 2
Peep and the Big Wide World	Canada, United States	2004–2011	
This Just In!	United States	2004	
Shorties Watchin' Shorties	United States	2004	
O'Grady	United States	2004–2006	
Stroker & Hoop	United States	2004–2005	
Foster's Home for Imaginary Friends	United States	2004–2009	used Adobe Photoshop, Adobe Illustrator, Adobe Animate, and Adobe After Effects
Atomic Betty	Canada, France	2004–2008	
KikoRiki	Russia	2004-2024	
ToddWorld	United States, Canada	2004–2008	
Hi Hi Puffy AmiYumi	United States	2004–2006	used Adobe Photoshop (for backgrounds), and Toon Boom Harmony (for characters in hand-drawn animation) combines animation with live action
Monica's Gang	Brazil	2004–present	switched to Flash around season 13 and switched to Toon Boom Harmony in season 23
Toopy and Binoo	Canada	2005–2006	
Bromwell High	Canada, United Kingdom	2005	
Maple Shorts	Canada	2005–2006	
We Are Catholic	United States	2005–2009	
The Zimmer Twins	Canada	2005–2008	
The Buzz on Maggie	United States	2005–2006	
12 oz. Mouse	United States	2005–2007, 2020	
Time Warp Trio	Canada, United States	2005–2006	
Son of Butcher	Canada	2005–2007	
Gerald McBoing Boing	United States, Canada	2005–2007	animated with Toon Boom Harmony
Carl²	Canada	2005–2011	
Delilah & Julius	Canada	2005–2008	
Hopeless Pictures	United States	2005	
SuperNews!	United States	2005–2010	
Fudêncio e Seus Amigos	Brazil	2005–2011	
Coconut Fred's Fruit Salad Island!	United States	2005–2006	
Sunday Pants	United States	2005	combined with CGI animation and live action imagery
Little Einsteins	United States	2005–2009	combined with CGI animation and live action imagery
Squidbillies	United States	2005–2021	used Adobe Photoshop, Adobe Animate, Adobe Illustrator and Adobe After Effects
Minoriteam	United States	2005–2006	
Johnny Test	Canada, United States	2005–2014	used ToonBoom around season 1, then switched to Flash around seasons 2-6
Fernanda	Cuba	2005-2012	used Flash
I Got a Rocket	Australia, United States	2006–2007	
Yam Roll	Canada	2006	
Captain Flamingo	Canada	2006–2010	
Kappa Mikey	United States	2006–2008	used Adobe Animate, Adobe Photoshop and Autodesk Maya
Wonder Pets	United States	2006–2013	animated in After Effects
Pinky Dinky Doo	Canada, United States	2006	utilized Flash in season 1 and switched to CGI around season 2
Fetch! with Ruff Ruffman	United States	2006–2010	combines animation with live action
Where My Dogs At?	United States	2006	
Franny's Feet	Canada, United States	2006–2010	
Shorty McShorts' Shorts	United States	2006–2009	
The Secret Show	United Kingdom	2006–2007	
Metalocalypse	United States	2006–2013	used Adobe After Effects, Adobe Animate and Adobe Photoshop
Hanoka	Japan	2006	
Shuriken School	France, Spain	2006–2007	
Yin Yang Yo!	United States	2006–2009	
Wow! Wow! Wubbzy!	United States	2006–2010	
Dogstar	Australia	2006–2007	
Growing Up Creepie	Canada, United States	2006–2008	
Pucca	Canada, South Korea	2006–2008	used Adobe After Effects, Adobe Animate, Adobe Illustrator and Autodesk Maya
Freak Show	United States	2006	
Eloise: The Animated Series	United States	2006	
Frisky Dingo	United States	2006–2008	
El Chavo: The Animated Series	Mexico	2006–2014	
Assy McGee	United States	2006–2008	
Galinha Pintadinha	Brazil	2006–2023	
Neko Rahmen	Japan	2006–2007	
Ellen's Acres	United States	2007	
El Tigre: The Adventures of Manny Rivera	United States	2007–2008	
Wilbur	Canada	2007–2008	the series features live action puppets and Flash is used for the reading segments
The Nutshack	United States	2007–2011	the show used Adobe Photoshop, Adobe Flash, and Toon Boom Harmony
Superjail!	United States	2007–2014	used Adobe After Effects, Adobe Animate and Adobe Photoshop
Lil' Bush	United States	2007–2008	
Friday: The Animated Series	United States	2007	
George of the Jungle	Canada, United States	2007–2008, 2016–2017	
Iggy Arbuckle	Canada, United States	2007	
Total Drama	Canada	2007–2014, 2023–2024	the show used Adobe Photoshop, Adobe Flash, and Toon Boom Harmony
Code Monkeys	United States	2007–2008	
Slacker Cats	United States	2007–2009	
Futz!	Canada	2007–2008	
My Catholic Family	United States	2007–2013	
Ricky Sprocket: Showbiz Boy	Canada	2007–2009	
Supernormal	United Kingdom	2007	
WordGirl	United States	2007–2015	
Rockstar Ghost	Brazil	2007	
The Jorges	Brazil	2007–2008	
Wayside	Canada	2007–2008	used ToonBoom around season 1, then switched to Flash around season 2
Happy Monster Band	United Kingdom, United States	2007–2008	
Out of Jimmy's Head	United States	2007–2008	
Clang Invasion	Canada	2007–2008	
Busytown Mysteries	Canada	2007–2010	
Skunk Fu!	Ireland, United Kingdom	2007–2008	
Will and Dewitt	Canada	2007–2008	
Cyberchase	Canada, United States	2007–present	used ToonBoom around season 2, then switched to Flash around season 6
Edgar & Ellen	Canada, United States	2007–2008	
Fred's Head	Canada, France	2007–2008	
Sushi Pack	Canada, United States	2007–2009	
Gofrette	Canada	2008–2009	
Os Caça-Livros	Brazil	2008	
Os Reciclados	Brazil	2008	
The Mr. Men Show	United Kingdom, United States	2008–2009	
Pedro and Frankensheep	United Kingdom	2008	
Eliot Kid	France	2008–2012	
Can You Teach My Alligator Manners?	United States; Canada	2008–2009	
Uchi no Sanshimai	Japan	2008–2010	
Speed Racer: The Next Generation	United States	2008–2013	
Tasty Time with ZeFronk	United States	2008–2010	
Three Delivery	United States	2008–2009	
Click and Clack's As the Wrench Turns	United States	2008	
G2G: Got to Go	Australia	2008–2010	
Martha Speaks	Canada, United States	2008–2014	
Best Ed	Canada	2008–2009	
Making Fiends	United States	2008	
Willa's Wild Life	Canada	2008–2009	
Kid vs. Kat	Canada	2008–2011	
Wakfu	France	2008–present	
The Xtacles	United States	2008	
Spaceballs: The Animated Series	United States	2008–2009	
Crime Time	India	2008–2010	
Razzberry Jazzberry Jam	Canada	2008–2009	
As Aventuras de Gui & Estopa	Brazil	2008–2020	
Poppets Town	Canada	2009–2011	
Jimmy Two-Shoes	Canada	2009–2011	used ToonBoom around season 1, then switched to Flash around season 2
Bob & Doug	Canada	2009–2011	
Stoked	Canada	2009–2013	
YooHoo & Friends	South Korea	2009–2015	
Kiara e os Luminitos	Brazil	2009	
Pixel Pinkie	Australia	2009–2012	
Angel's Friends	Italy	2009–2010	
Sally Bollywood: Super Detective	Australia, France	2009–2013	

== 2010s ==
Title	Country	Year	Notes and technique used
Black Panther	United States	2010	
Battle for Dream Island	United States	2010–present	used Flash 8 around seasons 1-3, then switched to Animate around season 4; the second half of season 2 uses the aforementioned Animate
64 Zoo Lane	United Kingdom, France	2010–2013	used Pegs'n Co/ToonBoom around season 1, then switched to Flash around season 3
SciGirls	United States	2010–2023	
The Ricky Gervais Show	United States	2010–2012	
Hero: 108	Canada, Taiwan, United Kingdom, United States	2010–2012	
Ugly Americans	United States	2010–2012	
Neighbors from Hell	United States	2010	
The Dukes of Broxstonia	Australia	2010–2013	
The Cat in the Hat Knows a Lot About That!	Canada, United Kingdom, United States	2010–2018	
My Little Pony: Friendship Is Magic	Canada, United States	2010–2019	uses Adobe Animate, Adobe Photoshop, and Adobe After Effects
Mad	United States	2010–2013	uses multiple styles and techniques Flash animation, puppetry, stop-motion, Toon Boom Harmony on Spy vs Spy shorts seasons 1–2, Computer animation, live action, etc.
Pound Puppies	United States	2010–2013	
Sidekick	United States; Canada	2010–2013	
Maryoku Yummy	United States	2010	
Puppy in My Pocket: Adventures in Pocketville	Italy	2010 –2011	
Dick Figures	United States	2010–2015	webseries
Dan Vs.	United States	2011–2013	
Off the Air	United States	2011–present	some shorts
Almost Naked Animals	Canada	2011–2013	
Bob's Burgers	United States	2011	Season 1 only; later seasons are animated in ToonBoom
Mongo Wrestling Alliance	United States	2011	combines with CGI
The Problem Solverz	United States	2011–2013	
Trunk Train	Brazil	2011–2017	used Flash in season 1 and switched to Toon Boom Harmony around season 2
The Amazing World of Gumball	Ireland, United Kingdom, United States	2011–Present	used multiple styles and techniques (stylised traditional animation, puppetry, CGI, stop motion, Flash animation, live-action, etc.)
Sherlock Yack	France	2011–2016	
Crash Canyon	Canada	2011–2013	
China, IL	United States	2011–2015	
Secret Millionaires Club	United States	2011–2017	
Good Vibes	United States	2011	
Allen Gregory	United States	2011	
DC Nation Shorts	United States	2011–2014	some shorts
Scaredy Squirrel	Canada	2011–2013	animated in Toon Boom Harmony
1001 Nights	Canada	2011–2012	
Guess How Much I Love You	Australia, United Kingdom	2011–2017	
Arthur	Canada, United States	2012–2016	used Toonz around season 5, then switched to Flash around season 16 and switched to Toon Boom Harmony around season 20
Sítio do Picapau Amarelo	Brazil	2012–2016	
YooHoo & Friends (2012)	United States	2012	
Unsupervised	United States	2012	
Cartoon Planet	United States	2012–2014	
The Lingo Show	United Kingdom	2012–2013	
Wild Grinders	United States	2012–2015	
Motorcity	United States	2012–2013	used Adobe After Effects, Adobe Animate, Adobe Photoshop and Autodesk Maya
Black Dynamite	United States	2012–2015	
Randy Cunningham: 9th Grade Ninja	United States, United Kingdom, Ierland	2012–2015	
Daniel Tiger's Neighborhood	Canada, United States	2012–present	
Action Dad	Canada	2012–2013	
Brickleberry	United States	2012	Season 1 only
Nutri Ventures – The Quest for the 7 Kingdoms	Portugal	2012–2014	
Littlest Pet Shop	Canada, United States	2012–2016	
SheZow	Australia, Canada	2012–2013	
Teenage Fairytale Dropouts	Australia, Ireland, Mexico, United States	2012–2014	
Gawayn	France, Canada	2012	used Toon Boom in season 1 and switched to Flash around season 2
Eu e o Quarteto Apavorante	Brazil	2013–2014	
Rocket Monkeys	Canada	2013–2016	
Angry Birds Toons	Finland	2013–2014	"El Porkador!", "The Butterfly Effect", "Bird Flu", and "Piggies From the Deep", and the rest of the show was animated traditionally with ToonBoom for digital-ink-and-paint
Lalaloopsy	United States	2013–2014	
Teen Titans Go!	United States	2013–present	
Grojband	Canada	2013–2014	
Packages from Planet X	Canada, United States	2013–2014	
Wander Over Yonder	United States	2013–2016	animated in Toon Boom Harmony
High School USA!	United States	2013–2015	
ADHD Shorts	United States	2013–2016	
Jamie's Got Tentacles!	France	2013–2015	
Julius Jr.	Canada, United States	2013–2015	
Peg + Cat	Canada, United States	2013–2018	
Turbo Fast	United States	2013–2016	
Chozen	United States	2014	
Get Ace	Australia	2014	
Breadwinners	United States	2014–2016	
Nerds and Monsters	Canada	2014–2016	
TripTank	United States	2014–2016	
The Tom and Jerry Show	United States	2014	
Transformers: Rescue Bots	Canada, United States	2014–2016	used Toon Boom Harmony in season 1 and switched to Flash around season 2
Marcus Level	France	2014	
Tennessee Tuxedo and Chumley	United States	2014	YouTube webseries
Pip Ahoy!	United Kingdom	2014–2018	
The Skinner Boys: Guardians of the Lost Secrets	Australia	2014–2017	
Astroblast!	United States	2014–2015	
BoJack Horseman	United States	2014–2020	used Adobe After Effects, Adobe Animate, Adobe Photoshop and Autodesk Maya (opening animation), the rest of the show was animated traditionally with ToonBoom for digital-ink-and-paint
Mr. Pickles	United States	2014–2019	
Stone Quackers	United States	2014–2015	
Dr. Dimensionpants	Canada	2014–2015	
Peanuts	France, United States	2014–2016	
Hey Duggee	United Kingdom	2014–present	
Kid-E-Cats	Russia	2015–present	
Tee and Mo!	United Kingdom	2015	
Wussywat, The Clumsy Cat	United Kingdom	2015	
Like, Share, Die	United States	2015	
Get Blake!	France, United States	2015	
Chirp	Canada	2015–2016	
Zip Zip	France	2015–present	
El Chapulín Colorado Animado	Mexico	2015–2017	
Pirate Express	Australia, Canada	2015	
Alamat	Philippines	2015–2016	used Adobe After Effects, Adobe Animate, Adobe Photoshop and Autodesk Maya
Two More Eggs	United States	2015–2017	
Shimmer and Shine	United States	2015–2016	used Flash in season 1, switched to CGI in season 2
Total Drama Presents: The Ridonculous Race	Canada	2015	
Mixels	United States	2015–2016	used Toon Boom Harmony in season 1 and switched to Flash around season 2
Nina's World	Canada, United States	2015–2016	
Moonbeam City	Canada, United States	2015	
The Mr. Peabody & Sherman Show	United States	2015–2017	
Kuu Kuu Harajuku	Malaysia, Australia, United States, Canada	2015–2016	used Flash on season 1, switched to ToonBoom on seasons 2 and 3
Blazing Team: Masters of Yo Kwon Do	China, United States	2015–2017	
Supernoobs	Canada	2015–2019	
Jabu's Jungle	South Africa	2016	
Greatest Party Story Ever	United States	2016	used multiple styles and techniques (stylised traditional animation, stop motion, Flash animation, live-action)
Bunnicula	United States	2016–2018	
Zig and Zag	Ireland, United Kingdom	2016	
Looped	Canada	2016	
Aggretsuko	Japan	2016–2018	
Kulipari: An Army of Frogs	United States	2016	
Miss Moon	France	2016–present	
Counterfeit Cat	Canada, United Kingdom	2016–2017	
Regal Academy	Italy	2016–2018	combines Flash with CGI cel-shading
Freaktown	Canada	2016	
Party Legends	United States	2016–2017	
Brad Neely's Harg Nallin' Sclopio Peepio	United States	2016	
Home: Adventures with Tip & Oh	United States	2016–2018	
Future-Worm!	United States	2016–2018	
Right Now Kapow	United States	2016–2017	
Mighty Magiswords	United States	2016–2019	
P. King Duckling	China, United States	2016–2018	
The Fairly OddParents	United States	2016–2017	the final episodes of season 10 were animated in Adobe Flash; the rest of the series was animated traditionally with digital ink-and-paint
The Loud House	United States	2016–present	animated in Toon Boom Harmony with the hand-drawn animation style.
Winston Steinburger and Sir Dudley Ding Dong	Canada	2017	
We're Lalaloopsy	United States	2017	
Hanazuki: Full of Treasures	United States	2017–2019	
Bunsen Is a Beast	United States	2017–2018	
ToonMarty	Canada	2017	
Chuck's Choice	Canada	2017	
The Ollie & Moon Show	Canada, France, United States	2017–present	
My Little Pony: Equestria Girls	Canada, United States	2017	
Lazoo	Canada	2017–2019	
Star Wars Forces of Destiny	United States	2017–2018	
Niko and the Sword of Light	United States	2017–2019	
Welcome to the Wayne	Canada, United States	2017–2019	
3 Amigonauts	Canada	2017	
Sunny Day	Canada	2017–2020	combines Flash with Autodesk Maya
The Magic School Bus Rides Again	Canada, United States	2017–2018	
Papaya Bull	Brazil	2017–2018	
Belle and Sebastian	Canada, France	2017–2019	
Oswaldo	Brazil	2017–2021	
Marvel Super Hero Adventures	United States	2017–2020	
The Jellies!	United States	2017–2019	
Unikitty!	United States	2017–2020	
The Heroic Quest of the Valiant Prince Ivandoe	Denmark, United Kingdom	2017–2024	most characters are animated with Flash but the background is in stop-motion
Pete the Cat	United States	2017–2022	
Devilman Crybaby	Japan	2018	
Our Cartoon President	United States	2018–2020	animated with Adobe Character Animator
Pinkalicious & Peterrific	United Kingdom, United States	2018–present	animated in CelAction 2D
Corner Gas Animated	Canada	2018–2021	
Ballmastrz: 9009	United States	2018–2020	
Littlest Pet Shop: A World of Our Own	United States	2018–2019	
Aggretsuko	Japan	2018–2023	
Kitty Is Not a Cat	Australia	2018–2020	
The Adventures of Rocky and Bullwinkle	United States	2018–2019	
The Hollow	Canada	2018–2020	
The Epic Tales of Captain Underpants	United States	2018–2020	
Cupcake & Dino: General Services	Brazil, Canada	2018–2019	
Total DramaRama	Canada, United States	2018–2023	
Larry the Wonderpup	Australia	2018–2020	
Chip and Potato	Canada, United Kingdom	2018–2021	
Rise of the Teenage Mutant Ninja Turtles	United States	2018–2020	animated in Toon Boom Harmony
Woody Woodpecker	United States	2018–2022	YouTube webseries
Taffy	France	2018–2024	
Pinky Malinky	United States	2019	
Transformers: Rescue Bots Academy	Ireland, United States	2019–2021	
Carmen Sandiego	Canada, United States	2019–2021	used Adobe After Effects, Adobe Animate, Adobe Photoshop and Autodesk Maya
Rainbow Butterfly Unicorn Kitty	United States	2019	
Care Bears: Unlock the Magic	Canada, United States	2019–2024	
Gēmusetto Machu Picchu	United States	2019	
Lazor Wulf	United States	2019–2021	used Toon Boom Harmony during season 1, then switched to Flash around season 2
Tuca & Bertie	United States	2019–2022	
HobbyKids Adventures	United States	2019–2020	
Mao Mao: Heroes of Pure Heart	United States	2019–2020	used Adobe Photoshop, Adobe Animate, and Adobe After Effects
Berry Bees	Australia	2019–2020	
Xavier Riddle and the Secret Museum	Canada, United States	2019–present	
Momma Named Me Sheriff	United States	2019–2021	
Clifford the Big Red Dog	Canada, United States	2019–2021	
The Casagrandes	United States	2019–2022	Used Toon Boom Harmony for the characters (hand-drawn animation) and Photoshop for the backgrounds

== 2020s ==
Title	Country	Year	Notes and technique used
Cleopatra in Space	United States	2020–2021	
Magical Girl Friendship Squad: Origins	United States	2020	
Powerbirds	United States	2020	
Glitch Techs	United States	2020	animated in Toon Boom Harmony
Tooning Out the News	United States	2020–2023	Animated with Adobe Character Animator
Ollie's Pack	Canada	2020–2021	Animated in Toon Boom Harmony
The Midnight Gospel	United States	2020	Used Adobe After Effects for the compositing and visual effects, Adobe Animate for the characters (flash and hand-drawn animation) and Adobe Photoshop for the backgrounds
Solar Opposites	United States	2020–present	used Adobe After Effects, Adobe Photoshop, Autodesk Maya and Toon Boom Harmony
Looney Tunes Cartoons	United States	2020–2024	Flash animated with Toon Boom Harmony on some segments.
Hero Elementary	Canada, United States	2020–2022	
Star Trek: Lower Decks	United States	2020–2024	
YOLO: Crystal Fantasy	Australia, United States	2020–present	used Adobe After Effects, Adobe Animate, Autodesk Maya and Adobe Photoshop
Hoops	United States	2020	
Doomsday Brothers	Canada	2020–2021	
Magical Girl Friendship Squad	United States	2020	
Wild Life	United States	2020	
My Little Pony: Pony Life	United States, Ireland	2020–2021	Animated in Toon Boom Harmony
Pikwik Pack	United States, Canada	2020–2021	
The Mighty Ones	United States	2020–2022	
Trolls: TrollsTopia	United States	2020–2022	
Baby Shark's Big Show!	South Korea, United States	2020–2025	
Thomas & Friends: All Engines Go	Canada, United States	2021–2025	
Kid Cosmic	United States	2021–2022	Used Toon Boom Harmony with limited animation techniques
Devil May Care	United States	2021	
The Pole	United States	2021	
The Summoner	United States	2021	
Tom and Jerry Special Shorts	United States	2021	Animated in Toon Boom Harmony.
Birdgirl	United States	2021–2022	
Superhero Kindergarten	United States	2021–present	
Tom and Jerry in New York	United States	2021	
Chip 'n' Dale: Park Life	France, United States	2021–2024	
Jellystone!	United States	2021–2025	
The Prince	United States	2021	
I Heart Arlo	United States	2021	used Adobe After Effects, Adobe Animate and Toon Boom Harmony
Q-Force	United States	2021	
Teenage Euthanasia	United States	2021–present	
The Harper House	United States	2021	
Chicago Party Aunt	United States	2021–present	
Strawberry Shortcake: Berry in the Big City	Canada, United States and United Kingdom	2021–present	
Ten Year Old Tom	United States	2021–present	
Yabba-Dabba Dinosaurs	United States	2021–present	animated in Adobe Animate
The Ghost and Molly McGee	United States	2021–2024	Animated in Toon Boom Harmony
Inside Job	United States	2021–2022	Animated in Toon Boom Harmony
Fairfax	United States	2021–2022	
Harriet the Spy	United States	2021–present	
Smiling Friends	United States	2022–2026	animated in Adobe Animate
Angry Birds: Summer Madness	United States	2022	animated in Toon Boom Harmony
The Cuphead Show!	United States, Canada	2022	used Toon Boom Harmony with the look of hand-drawn animation
Doomlands	Canada, United States	2022–2024	
Fairview	United States	2022	
The Proud Family: Louder and Prouder	United States	2022–present	animated in Toon Boom Harmony
Human Resources	United States	2022–2023	
Transformers: BotBots	Canada, Ireland, United States	2022	
Dodo	United Kingdom	2022–present	
The Unstoppable Yellow Yeti	Finland, France	2022–present	animated in Toon Boom Harmony
Stella and Kate	United Kingdom	2022–2024	
Best & Bester	Finland, United Kingdom, Canada	2022–present	animated in Toon Boom Harmony
Duck & Goose	United States	2022–present	
Farzar	United States	2022	
Bugs Bunny Builders	United States	2022–present	
Super Wish	Canada	2022	
Little Demon	Canada, United States	2022	
Saving Me	Canada, United States	2022–present	animated in Toon Boom Harmony
Rosie's Rules	Canada, United States	2022–present	animated in Toon Boom Harmony
Hamster & Gretel	United States	2022–2025	used Toon Boom Harmony with the look of hand-drawn animation
Krapopolis	United States	2022–present	
Oddballs	United States	2022–2023	
Interrupting Chicken	Canada, United States	2022–2023	animated in Toon Boom Harmony
Koala Man	Australia, United States	2023	
Moon Girl and Devil Dinosaur	United States	2023–2025	used a mixture of Toon Boom Harmony (for staging and head-rigging) and hand-drawn animation (for character bodies)
Bossy Bear	United States	2023–present	
Work It Out Wombats!	United States	2023–present	animated in Toon Boom Harmony
Kiff	United States	2023–present	
Lu & the Bally Bunch	United States, Canada, Ireland	2023–present	
Digman!	United States	2023–present	
Clone High	United States	2023–2024	used hand-drawn animation during Season 1, and switched to Flash around season 2
Royal Crackers	United States	2023–2024	
Mulligan	United States	2023–2024	
Hailey's On It!	United States	2023–2024	
Praise Petey	United States	2023	
Tiny Toons Looniversity	United States	2023–2025	
Fright Krewe	United States	2023–present	
Zokie of Planet Ruby	Canada	2023	
Nature Fairies Adventures	United States	2024–present	
Lyla in the Loop	United States	2024–present	animated in Toon Boom Harmony
Camp Snoopy	United States	2024	animated in Toon Boom Harmony
Primos	United States	2024–2025	
Tales of the Teenage Mutant Ninja Turtles	United States	2024–present	
Universal Basic Guys	United States	2024–present	
Everybody Still Hates Chris	United States	2024–present	
Carl the Collector	Canada, United States	2024–present	Animated in Toon Boom Harmony
Wonder Pets: In the City	United States	2024	
StuGo	United States	2025	
Skillsville	Canada, United States	2025–2026	
Oh My God... Yes! A Series of Extremely Relatable Circumstances	United States	2025–present	
#1 Happy Family USA	United States	2025	
Super Duper Bunny League	United States	2025–present	
Super Team Canada	Canada	2025	animated in Toon Boom Harmony
Phineas and Ferb	United States	2025–present	seasons 5-6 are animated in Toon Boom Harmony
King of the Hill	United States	2025–present	the revival is animated in Toon Boom Harmony
The Doomies	France	2026	

== Upcoming ==
Name	Country	Original Broadcast	Production	Technique Used and Notes
Felix the Cat	United States	TBA	the revival will be animated in Toon Boom Harmony	

== Non-Flash shows that utilized Flash ==
Name	Country	Original Broadcast	Technique Used and Notes
Sesame Street	United States	1969–present	"Sesame Street English", "Elmo's World" (reboot), and "Abby's Amazing Adventures" segments, among other shorts
Thomas & Friends	United Kingdom	1984–2021	Transitions eg: signal junction, book cover, jigsaw puzzle, Thomas' whistles
VeggieTales	United States	1993–2015	Fantasy sequences and dream sequences
The Rosie O'Donnell Show	United States	2000	Title sequence animated by Bullseye Art
Between the Lions	United States	2000–2010	
Liberty's Kids	United States	2002–2003	Liberty News Network segment
Hi-5	United States	2003–2006	Theme song
The Venture Bros.	United States	2004–2018	Used Adobe After Effects, Adobe Animate and Adobe Illustrator for the pilot episode
Maya & Miguel	United States	2004–2007	What Is It? Take a Guess shorts and "WordGirl" short episodes
Unfabulous	United States	2004–2007	Main Title Digital Animation/Graphics by Nick Digital East
Ben 10	United States	2005–2008	Title sequence
Yo Gabba Gabba!	United States	2007–2015	most animation
Out of Jimmy's Head	United States	2007–2008	animated characters Golly, Dolly, Tux, and Crocoo
Care Bears: Adventures in Care-a-lot	United States	2007	Theme song
Chowder	United States	2007–2010	The Powerpuff Girls cameos
The Electric Company	United States	2009–2011	Captain Cluck Haunted House Pets Home Alone and Prankster Planet
Bubble Guppies	United States	2009–2016, 2019–2023	Facial elements, song, lunchtime and story sequences (seasons 1–4)
Alphablocks	United Kingdom	2010–2022	2D elements (e.g. Facial elements)
Adventure Time	United States	2010–2018	The show was animated traditionally in digital-ink-and-paint and backgrounds drawn with Photoshop; BMO's boat story in Ketchup; Autodesk Maya and Autodesk 3ds Max used for A Glitch is a Glitch; Adobe Animate used for Food Chain
Pictureka!	United States	2010–2011	Theme song
Hubworld	United States	2010–2011	animated clips from My Little Pony: Friendship is Magic, Pound Puppies, and Dan Vs.
Gravity Falls	United States	2012–2016	Unaired pilot, the series used Toonz
Groove High	United Kingdom, France, Ireland, Belgium, China, Philippines	2012–2013	Various animated segments
The Aquabats! Super Show!	United States	2012–2014	Various animated segments
Doc McStuffins	United States	2013	"The Doc Files" short series
Paw Patrol	Canada	2013–present	The lookout tower bigscreen's animation
Shark Tank	United States	2013	Dr. Doofenshmirtz's animation
Steven Universe	United States	2013	Steven's Cheeseburger Backpack promo
Ping Pong the Animation	Japan	2014	Various Shots animated in flash
Blaze and the Monster Machines	United States	2014–2025	Diagrams of animals for the "Wild Wheels" miniseries
Odd Squad	Canada, United States	2014–present	Animation Segments of The Shmumberland Comic Book in "Olive and Otto in Shmumberland Parts 1 & 2", the Arcade Machine video game in "Game Time" and Ocean's Story of why The Cherry-on-Top-inator should not be destroyed in "The Cherry-on-Top-inator"
Space Dandy	Japan	2014	episodes 1 and 16
The Simpsons	United States	2015	"Simprovised" live ending animated with Adobe Character Animator, Rick Sanchez and Morty Smith from Rick and Morty in "Mathlete's Feat" was animated in Flash
Son of Zorn	United States	2016–2017	animated characters Zorn, Lord Vulchazor, Reverend, Sir Pent, Radiana, Dorothy Clementina / Headbutt Girl, Headbutt Man, Dr. Klorpins, Skunk Man, Animal Pelts, Demon Spirits and Mudman, Gobos the Great, and Laseron
Pocoyo	Spain	2016–2019	Theme song in Season 4a
Numberblocks	United Kingdom	2017–2021	2D elements
DuckTales (2017)	United States	2017–2021	Title sequence and some shots
Vampirina	United States	2018–2019	"Ghoul Girls Rock" short series
Abby Hatcher	Canada	2019–2022	Fuzzly Spotter animation
Ryan's Mystery Playdate	United States	2019–2021	Gus the Gummy Gator and Combo Panda's animation
Amphibia	United States	2019–2022	Title sequence and all shorts appearances except "Teen Girl in a Frog World" and "Theme Song Takeover"
Disney Channel: Holidays Unwrapped	United States	2020	Cricket and Tilly's animation
Big City Greens	United States	2019–present	The "Chipocalypse Now" episode (created using Toon Boom Harmony) and all shorts appearances except "Country Kids in the City" and half of "Theme Song Takeover"
Green Eggs and Ham	United States	2019–2022	Title sequence and some shots; the series itself was animated in TV Paint
The Owl House	United States	2020–2023	Title sequence
Disney Channel's Epic Holiday Showdown	United States	2020	Cricket and Gramma's animation
Invincible	United States	2021–present	Some shots
The Fairly OddParents: Fairly Odder	United States	2022	Timmy Turner, Cosmo and Wanda's animations
Colourblocks	United Kingdom	2022–2023	animation for the scribbles when the Colourblock colors the item, also used for the scribbles in beginning of the intro
Kindergarten: The Musical	United States	2024–2025	2D-animated sequences

== See also ==
- Flash animation
- Adobe After Effects
- Adobe Animate
- Adobe Character Animator
- Adobe Flash
- List of Flash animated films
