= Cambridge Animation Systems =

Software company in United Kingdom

Animo Cambridge Animation Systems
- Developer: Cambridge Animation Systems Ltd.
- Release: 1992; 34 years ago
- Final release: 6.0 / 8 December 2004; 21 years ago
- Operating system: Microsoft Windows, Mac OS X, SGI O2
- Type: 2D animation software
- License: Proprietary

Cambridge Animation Systems was a British software company that developed a traditional animation software package called Animo and is now part of Canadian company Toon Boom Technologies. It was based in Cambridge, England, hence the name. Established in 1990, it created the Animo software in 1992 after acquiring Compose in Color, which was developed by Oliver Unter-ecker. Animo was used for several animated feature films, shorts, and television series, and it powered the UK animation industry until the 2000s as it was used by studios like King Rollo Films, Telemagination, and Cosgrove Hall Films, but it was also used by studios in other countries, most notably Warner Bros. Feature Animation, DreamWorks, and Nelvana. In total, Animo was used by over 300 studios worldwide.

In 2000, CAS developed Animo Inkworks, a plug-in which allowed Maya and 3ds Max users to export 3D data into Animo and integrate it into 2D animation via the Scene III plug-in. In 2001, they developed another plug-in called Animo Sniffworks, which exports Flash output to Maya.

In 2009, CAS was acquired by Toon Boom Technologies and has since folded.

== Usage ==
- Adventures in the Lost Kingdom of Radish
- American Dragon: Jake Long (along with MediaPegs, Photoshop, Toon Boom and Toonz)
- Angelina Ballerina
- The Animals of Farthing Wood
- Anthony Ant
- Azumanga Daioh: The Animation
- Baby Looney Tunes
- Balto II: Wolf Quest (along with Toon Boom and Toonz)
- Balto III: Wings of Change (along with Toon Boom and Toonz)
- The Batman (along with MediaPegs, Photoshop, Toon Boom and Toonz)
- Ben Hur
- Bob and Margaret
- Cats Don't Dance
- Christmas Carol: The Movie
- Clone High (season 1, along with MediaPegs, Photoshop, Toon Boom and Toonz)
- Courage the Cowardly Dog (along with AXA, MediaPegs, Toon Boom and Toonz)
- Dilbert (along with AXA, MediaPegs, Toon Boom and Toonz)
- Enid Blyton's Enchanted Lands
- Eight Crazy Nights (along with MediaPegs, Photoshop, Toon Boom and Toonz)
- Fimbles
- Firehouse Tales
- Flying Rhino Junior High (along with AXA, MediaPegs, Toon Boom and Toonz)
- Franklin
- Gladiator Academy
- Globi and the Stolen Shadows
- Happily Ever After: Fairy Tales for Every Child
- Harry and His Bucket Full of Dinosaurs
- Horrid Henry (season 1)
- The Iron Giant
- Johnny Test (season 1, along with MediaPegs, Photoshop, Toon Boom and Toonz)
- Joseph: King of Dreams (along with Toon Boom)
- Kim Possible
- The King and I
- Kung Fu Panda (2d animated sequences only)
- Krypto the Superdog
- Laura's Star
- Laura's Star and the Mysterious Dragon Nian
- The Life and Times of Juniper Lee (along with MediaPegs, Photoshop, Toon Boom and Toonz)
- Lilo & Stitch: The Series (along with Photoshop, Toon Boom, USAnimation and Toonz)
- The Little Polar Bear
- The Little Polar Bear (2001)
- The Little Polar Bear 2: The Mysterious Island
- Little Bear (along with MediaPegs and Toon Boom)
- Loonatics Unleashed (along with MediaPegs, Photoshop, Toon Boom and Toonz)
- Looney Tunes: Back in Action (along with Toon Boom)
- Lotte's Journey South
- Maisy
- Maya & Miguel (along with MediaPegs, Photoshop, Toon Boom and Toonz)
- Mission Hill (main titles and some scenes, along with AXA, cel, MediaPegs, Photoshop, Toon Boom and Toonz)
- Mole Sisters
- Mona the Vampire (along with AXA, MediaPegs, Photoshop and Toon Boom)
- Ned's Newt (along with AXA, MediaPegs, Toon Boom and USAnimation)
- The New Woody Woodpecker Show (season 3)
- Osmosis Jones
- Ozzy & Drix (along with MediaPegs, Photoshop, Toon Boom and Toonz)
- Pond Life (season 1)
- Pongwiffy (season 2)
- Prelude to Eden
- Prezzemolo
- The Prince of Egypt (along with Toon Boom)
- Quest for Camelot
- Rainbow Fish (along with USAnimation)
- Roboroach (season 2)
- The Road to El Dorado (along with Toon Boom)
- Rudi and Trudi
- Sergeant Stripes
- Seven Little Monsters (season 3)
- Shaggy & Scooby-Doo Get a Clue! (along with MediaPegs, Photoshop, Toon Boom and Toonz)
- Silverwing (along with MediaPegs, Photoshop, Toon Boom and Toonz)
- Sinbad: Legend of the Seven Seas (along with Toon Boom)
- Snailsbury Tales
- Space Jam
- Spirit: Stallion of the Cimarron (along with Toon Boom)
- Star Wars: Clone Wars
- Static Shock (along with MediaPegs, Photoshop, Toon Boom and Toonz)
- Time Squad (along with MediaPegs, Photoshop, Toon Boom and Toonz)
- Toot & Puddle: I'll Be Home For Christmas
- Tytus, Romek and A’Tomek Among the Thieves of Dreams
- Undergrads (along with MediaPegs, Photoshop, Toon Boom and Toonz)
- The Village
- Wayside (season 1, along with MediaPegs and Toon Boom)
- What's New, Scooby-Doo? (along with MediaPegs, Photoshop, Toon Boom and Toonz)
- Wheel Squad
- Wide Eye
- Wiggly Park
- Winx Club (seasons 1 to 4, along with After Effects, MediaPegs, Photoshop and Toon Boom)

See here

== See also ==
- Toon Boom Technologies, which acquired CAS and its Animo package
- Toonz, another prolific animation software used by the 2D industry in the 1990s and 2000s
- USAnimation
- Pegs'n Co
- Computer Animation Production System (CAPS), used by Disney from the 1990s to the mid-2000s
- Adobe Flash
- RETAS, used by the anime industry
- List of 2D animation software
