= Pegs'n Co =

French software company

Pegs Pegs'n Co
- Developer: Pegs'n Co
- Release: 1991; 35 years ago
- Final release: 4.3 / 2020; 6 years ago
- Operating system: Windows
- Type: 2D animation software
- License: Proprietary
- Website: www.pegsnco.fr

Pegs'n Co was a French software company that developed a traditional animation software package called Pegs, and is now part of Canadian company Toon Boom Animation. It was based in Paris, France. Pegs was used for several animated feature films, shorts, and television series, and it powered the French animation industry until the 2000s as it was used by studios like Millimages, Alphanim, and Animage, but it was also used by studios in other countries, most notably Saerom Animation, CineGroupe, and Mike Young Productions. In total, Pegs was used by over 100 studios worldwide.

== History ==
In 1991, Pixibox, a French animation studio, decided to develop its own ink & paint and compositing tools in order to make one of the first fully digital animated series, Pierre et Isa. The first version of Pegs was released under the name Pixiscan. In 1994, Pixibox began to market the product, and the first Pegs licenses were sold.

In 1997, following the acquisition of the company by Humanoids Group, Mediapegs was set up in order to handle the development and licensing of Pegs. In 1999, a new version of Pegs for Windows NT was launched, which allowed users to animate with both bitmaps and vectors. In September 2003, after two uneasy years for the animation market, Mediapegs was forced to file for bankruptcy.

After Mediapegs closed, four former employees grew increasingly concerned about the demise of Pegs and the future of professionals using the technology. Bolstered by the support of many within the animation industry, they decided to create a new company called Pegs'n Co. In June 2004, a new version of Pegs was released, and Pegs'n Co enjoyed renewed success, taking part in Annecy's festival with a new version every year, and being involved in feature films and numerous international shows.

In 2006, Toon Boom acquired Pegs'n Co as part of its growth strategy. Since the acquisition, in the same year, the software has not been updated and can no longer be purchased, later in 2020.

== Usage ==
=== For films and TV ===
- 64 Zoo Lane (seasons 1-2)
- Aida of the Trees (along with Toonz)
- Animal Stories
- Angel Wings
- Archibald the Koala
- Archie's Weird Mysteries
- Arthur (seasons 5-10, along with AXA)
- The Avengers: United They Stand
- Babar (season 6)
- Baby Looney Tunes (along with Toonz, for all 4 seasons, Animo, for all 4 seasons, USAnimation, for seasons 1-3, and Toon Boom for season 4)
- Bad Dog
- Baldo
- The Baskervilles
- Bamboo Bears
- The Bear's Island (episodes 22-26)
- The Bellflower Bunnies (seasons 1-2)
- Billy the Cat
- Black Mor's Island
- Blazing Dragons (along with Animo and Toon Boom)
- Bob Morane
- Bounty Hamster
- The Boy
- Braceface
- Buzz Lightyear of Star Command (along with USAnimation)
- Caillou (seasons 1-3, along with Animo, and USAnimation)
- Captain Red Beard
- Carnivale
- Care Bears: Adventures in Care-a-lot (season 1)
- Cartouche: Prince of the Streets
- CatDog (seasons 3-4, along with Toonz)
- Cédric
- Charley and Mimmo
- Chowder (season 1)
- Chris Colorado
- Clerks: The Animated Series
- Clifford the Big Red Dog
- Code Lyoko (along with Animo, Toon Boom and Toonz)
- Cosmic Cowboys
- The Cramp Twins
- Cyberchase (seasons 1-2)
- Daddy DJ - Daddy DJ
- Daddy DJ - The Girl In Red
- Daria
- Dennis & Gnasher (season 2)
- Dino Squad
- Doug (seasons 3-7)
- Downtown
- Dora the Explorer (seasons 1-3)
- Dr. Zitbag's Transylvania Pet Shop
- Dragon Flyz
- Dragon Hunters (along with Toon Boom)
- Dragon Tales (seasons 2-3, along with USAnimation, for season 2, Toonz, for seasons 2-3, and Animo, for season 3)
- Duck Ugly
- Eddy and the Bear
- Elliot Moose
- Esprit fantômes
- Ethelbert the Tiger
- Famille Pirate
- Family Guy (along with Animo, AXA, Toon Boom and Toonz)
- Fat Dog Mendoza
- Fennec (along with Animo, AXA, Toon Boom and Toonz)
- Firehouse Tales (2D animation only, along with USAnimation and Animo)
- Fire Quest
- Foot 2 Rue (along with Animo, Photoshop, Toon Boom and Toonz)
- Flight Squad
- Fly Tales
- Flying Rhino Junior High (along with Animo and Toon Boom)
- Gadget and the Gadgetinis
- Galactik Football (season 1)
- Gargantua
- Go, Diego! Go! (season 1)
- Gordon the Garden Gnome
- A Goofy Movie
- He-Man and the Masters of the Universe
- Heavy Metal 2000
- Hey Arnold! (seasons 4-5, along with USAnimation, for season 4, and Animo, for season 5)
- Holly Hobbie and Friends
- Horrid Henry (season 1, along with Animo)
- Horseland
- How the Toys Saved Christmas
- Huntik (season 1)
- Inami
- Iron Nose
- Itty Bitty Heartbeats
- Jack and Marcel
- Jasper the Penguin
- Jim Button
- Johnny Bravo (seasons 3-4, along with Toonz, for seasons 3-4, USAnimation, for season 3, and Animo, for season 4)
- Kangooeasons
- Kangoo Juniors
- Kaput & Zösky
- KaBlam! ("Randall Flan's Incredible Big Top" and "JetCat")
- Kid Clones
- Kid Paddle
- The Kids from Room 402
- Kim Possible (seasons 1-3, along with Toonz, Animo, and Toon Boom, for all 4 seasons, and USAnimation for season 1)
- King of the Hill (seasons 8-10, along with USAnimation and Toonz)
- The King's Beard
- Kirikou and the Wild Beasts
- The Lampies
- La Princesse du Nil
- The Large Family (season 1)
- Les Mille et Une Prouesses de Pépin Troispommes
- Les Misérables
- Les Zooriginaux
- Les Pastagums
- Liberty's Kids
- The Likeaballs
- Lilly the Witch (seasons 1-2)
- Lion of Oz
- Little Dracula
- Little Hippo
- Little Vampire
- Lucky and Zorba
- Lupo Alberto
- Madeline (season 3)
- Maggie and the Ferocious Beast (along with Animo)
- The Magic Key
- The Magician (along with Animo)
- Marcelino, pan y vino
- Marsupilami (seasons 1-2)
- The Marvelous Misadventures of Flapjack (season 1)
- Mary-Kate and Ashley in Action!
- Mega Babies
- Metalheads
- Milo
- Mona the Vampire (along with Animo and Toon Boom)
- Mot
- Mr. Men and Little Miss
- My Gym Partner's a Monkey (season 1)
- My Goldfish is Evil (season 1)
- NASCAR Racers
- Ned's Newt
- The Neverending Story
- The New Adventures of Lucky Luke
- The New Woody Woodpecker Show (seasons 1-2)
- Ni Hao, Kai-Lan (season 1)
- Nick & Perry
- Norman Normal
- Oggy and the Cockroaches (seasons 1-3)
- Oscar's Orchestra
- Old Tom
- Oswald
- Pablo the Little Red Fox
- Papyrus
- Pelswick
- Persepolis
- Petzi und seine Freunde
- Pierre et Isa/Peter et Sonia
- Pigeon Boy
- Pim Wright
- Pitt and Kantrop
- Planet Grabo
- Poil de carotte
- Pond Life (season 2)
- Pongwiffy (season 1)
- Popetown
- Prince of Atlantis
- Princess Sissi
- Prudence Petitpas
- Random! Cartoons ("Girls on the GO!" and "Thom Cat")
- Ratz
- Renada
- RoboRoach (season 1)
- Rupert (season 3)
- Sabrina's Secret Life
- Sabrina: The Animated Series
- Sagwa, the Chinese Siamese Cat
- The Secret Saturdays (season 1)
- The Secret World of Santa Claus
- Seven Little Monsters (seasons 1-2)
- Silverwing
- Sky Dancers
- Sonic Underground
- Sophie's Misfortunes
- SOS Croco
- Space Goofs
- Space Strikers
- Spirou
- Spirou et Fantasio (season 1)
- Stanley
- Stargate Infinity
- Static Shock (along with Animo, Toon Boom and Toonz)
- Strawberry Shortcake
- Student Bodies
- Sushi Pack
- Talis and the Thousand Tasks
- T'choupi
- Timothy Goes to School (along with Animo and Toon Boom)
- Titanic: The Legend Goes On
- The Tofus
- Tom et Sheenah
- Totò Sapore and the magical story of pizza
- The Triplets
- Trollz
- Tupu
- Undergrads
- The Wacky World of Tex Avery
- Watch My Chops (seasons 1-2)
- Wayside (season 1, along with Animo, and Toon Boom)
- The Way Things Work
- What About Mimi? (season 1)
- What's with Andy? (seasons 1-2)
- Wheel Squad (along with Animo, and USAnimation)
- Winx Club (seasons 1-2)
- W.I.T.C.H.
- Woofy
- Wombat City
- X-DuckX
- Xyber 9: New Dawn
- Yvon of the Yukon (along with Toon Boom and USAnimation)
- Zoe and Charlie

=== For video games ===
- The Fairly OddParents: Breakin' Da Rules (PC version; cutscenes)

== See also ==
- Toon Boom Animation, which acquired Pegs'n Co and its Pegs package
- USAnimation
- Cambridge Animation Systems
- Toonz, another prolific animation software used by the 2D industry in the 1990s and 2000s
- Computer Animation Production System (CAPS), used by Disney from the 1990s to the mid-2000s
- Adobe Flash
- List of 2D animation software
