= Toon Boom =

Canadian software company

Toon Boom Animation Inc.
- Type: Subsidiary
- Industry: Software
- Founded: 1994; 32 years ago
- Headquarters: Montreal, Quebec, Canada
- Products: Animation and Storyboarding software
- Parent: Corus Entertainment (2012–23); Integrated Media Company (2023–present)
- Website: toonboom.com

Toon Boom Animation Inc., also known as Toon Boom, is a Canadian software company founded in 1994 and based in Montreal, Quebec. It specializes in the development and production of animation and storyboarding software for film, television, the Web, video games, mobile devices, training and education.

Its software, including Toon Boom Harmony, has been used globally and received Primetime Engineering Emmy Awards in 2005 and 2012.

== History ==
2001–17

2017–22

Former logos

In 1996, Toon Boom purchased the software development business of USAnimation Studio. Its animation production services were to be merged into CST Entertainment according to a premature press release from CST. That merge never took place, and USAnimation's studio changed its name to VirtualMagic Animation in 1996 and operated independently. Toon Boom Animation continued the development of USAnimation software, which became Toon Boom Opus. It has since become Toon Boom Harmony.

Founding president and chief executive officer Jacques Bilodeau left the company in May 2003, and the company's board of directors appointed chief operating officer Joan Vogelesang to take his place. In 2004, Corus Entertainment, owner of Canadian animation studio Nelvana, acquired a 50% stake in the company.

In 2006, Toon Boom acquired French company Pegs'n Co, developer of the 2D bitmap animation software Pegs. Since the acquisition, the software has not been updated and can no longer be purchased.

In 2009, Toon Boom acquired the British company Cambridge Animation Systems, developer of Animo. Since the acquisition, the software has not been updated and can no longer be purchased.

In 2012, Corus acquired the remaining 50% stake of Toon Boom it did not already own, giving it full ownership. Chief Executive Officer and President Joan Vogelesang stepped down in September 2014 after over 16 years at Toon Boom, and Paul Gardner was appointed as interim CEO.

On March 9, 2016, Toon Boom acquired all the related IP for the TACTIC Studio product, an asset management, production tracking and review tool from Toronto-based Southpaw Technology and planned to re-launch the product as Toon Boom Producer. On June 13, 2017, Toon Boom re-branded and launched Producer.

On July 13, 2023, Corus announced that it would sell Toon Boom to Integrated Media Company (IMC), a portfolio of private equity firm TPG Inc., for US$111 million (CA$147.5 million). Corus stated that the sale would be used to cover debt and "advance our strategic plan and priorities".

=== Historical products ===
- Toon Boom Opus (1996–2008) - formerly USAnimation, it was used in the traditional film/TV animation industry.
- Tic Tac Toon (1996–2001) was succeeded by Toon Boom Studio.
- Toon Boom Studio (2001–15) was aimed at home users and individuals, and succeeded by Toon Boom Harmony Essentials.
- Toon Boom Concerto (2004–05)
- Toon Boom Solo (2005–07) was aimed at small studios. It was succeeded by Toon Boom Digital Pro.
- Toon Boom Digital Pro (2007–09) was succeeded by Toon Boom Animate Pro.
- Toon Boom Pencil Check Pro (2008–14) was a line testing software product.
- Toon Boom Animate (2008–15) was aimed at professional animators, boutique studios, students, and educators. Succeeded by Toon Boom Harmony Advanced.
- Toon Boom Manager (2009–14) was a production tracking system for the entertainment industry.
- Toon Boom Animate Pro (2009–15) was aimed at animation studios and freelancers.
- Flip Boom product line (discontinued in 2014) - entry-level animation software.
- Garfield's Comic Boom (discontinued in 2014) is a comic strip or album creation software product developed with cartoonist Jim Davis. The application included built-in video tutorials by the cartoonist.

== Products ==
Harmony (software)
- Developer: Toon Boom Animation Inc.
- Stable release: June 10, 2025; 15 months ago
- Written in: C++ (Qt), Qt Script, JavaScript, Python
- Operating system: Microsoft Windows, macOS, Linux
- Platform: x64
- Available in: English, Spanish, Japanese, and Chinese
- Type: 2D animation software
- License: Trialware
- Website: www.toonboom.com

=== Harmony ===
Harmony supports cutout (puppet), paperless frame-by-frame, and traditional animation workflows including scanning, composing, and 2D/3D integration. Features include texturized pencil lines, deformation tools, morphing, inverse kinematics, particles, a built-in compositor, 3D camera tracking, and 2D-3D integration. It supports drawing directly via a graphics tablet.

=== Harmony Database ===
Harmony Database is an multi-user add-on for Harmony Advanced and Harmony Premium. It utilizes a centralized database system to share assets between scenes and across production studios. It features production controls for rendering jobs and batch scanning of paper drawings.

=== Storyboard Pro ===
Storyboard Pro is used in pre-production to develop storyboards and animatics for 2D and 3D animation, stop motion, and live-action productions. Its features include vector and bitmap drawing tools, brushes, a virtual camera, audio utilities, a timeline, and functions to integrate imported 3D models.

=== Ember ===
Ember is an animation software suite that incorporates generative AI tools.

=== Producer ===
Producer is a web-based production tracking and digital asset management application based on the acquired TACTIC Studio codebase.

== See also ==
- Adobe Animate
- Adobe Character Animator
- Cambridge Animation Systems
- Computer Animation Production System
- Toonz
- Pixibox
- CrazyTalk
- List of 2D animation software
- List of Flash animated television series
- USAnimation
- Vyond
