= Bullseye Art =

New York City based art collective

- Type: Private
- Industry: Animation, digital art, web entertainment
- Founded: 1995
- Founders: Josh Kimberg, Nick Cogan, Ryan Edwards
- Defunct: 2003
- Successor: Magic Butter / Raw Power
- Key people: Josh Kimberg (Creative Director), Nick Cogan (Animator), Ryan Edwards (Producer)
- Website: bullseyeart.com (archived)

Bullseye Art was a New York City-based art collective that pioneered art and animation on the web. Founded in 1995 by Josh Kimberg, Nick Cogan and Ryan Edwards, the company gained fame for creating unique and offbeat interactive cartoons made using Macromedia Flash.

Bullseye Art became well known for its humour with such cartoons as Porkchops, which portrayed a talking donkey in surrealistic situations, and Miss Muffy and the Muff Mob, about a band of rapping muffin-headed girls. A dragon named Hooptie-Goo often appeared as a mascot during the opening or closing credits. Other multi-episode cartoons included Internet – The Animated Series, Rat Chicken, Space Dog, Makin' Moves and The Rhino and Nutmeg Show.

The company was commissioned to do several high-profile cartoon segments, the most notable of which was the opening titles for The Rosie O'Donnell Show, for which they were nominated for two Emmy Awards. The animated opening was the first work of Flash Animation to appear on television. They also created the music videos First Tube and You Enjoy Myself for the rock band Phish.

Bullseye Art maintained a free entertainment portal featuring many of the first community features now standard on the internet. Revenue was driven by licensing their cartoons to third-party sites (Atom Films, Shockwave.com, HBO's Volume.com, Razorfish) and from commercial animation (Icebox.com, Kenny the Shark). Bullseye Art shut its doors in 2003, and the founders started a production company named Raw Power. During this period (2003–2004), most of the cartoons were unavailable.

In 2005, Josh Kimberg launched the cartoons under the new name Magic Butter. While initially a pay site, MagicButter.com eventually became free, displaying all of the old content along with new cartoons, T-shirts for sale, and free downloads such as MP3s, desktop wallpapers, and icons until it shut down.
