= Aida of the Trees =

2001 Italian film

- Directed by: Guido Manuli
- Written by: Guido Manuli; Umberto Marino
- Story by: Guido Manuli
- Produced by: Maria Fares (executive producer)
- Starring: Jasmine Laurenti; Simone D'Andrea; Enzo Iacchetti; Vittorio Bestoso; Massimo Lopez; Elda Olivieri; Mario Scarabelli; Giorgio Melazzi; Gianni Gaude; Olivia Manescalchi; Ciro Imparato; Michele Di Mauro; Gino Lana
- Edited by: Eoin Murphy
- Music by: Ennio Morricone
- Production company: Lanterna Magica
- Distributed by: Medusa Film
- Release date: 21 December 2001 (Italy)
- Running time: 75 minutes
- Country: Italy
- Language: Italian

Aida of the Trees (Italian: Aida degli alberi) is a 2001 Italian musical adventure fantasy animated film written and directed by Guido Manuli with soundtrack by Ennio Morricone. It is the third movie produced by the studio Lanterna Magica after How the Toys Saved Christmas and Lucky and Zorba, and it is loosely inspired by Giuseppe Verdi's opera Aida.

Was released in Italy on December 21, 2001 by Medusa Film and in North America on June 7, 2002 by Walt Disney Pictures

== Plot ==
Arborea and Petra are two neighbouring countries perpetually at war with one another. Only the romantic relationship between Aida, the daughter of the Arborean king, and Radames, the brave son of the high general of Petra, will change the situation. The couple's worst enemy is Ramfis, the high priest of the evil god Satam, who would like his clumsy son Kak to marry the princess of Petra (who's engaged to Radames). After a series of adventures and fierce battles, Aida and Radames will manage to defeat Ramfis, to end the war between their countries and to live happily ever after.

== Cast ==
- Jasmine Laurenti/ Filippa Giordano as Aida
- Simone D'Andrea/ Peppe Servillo as Radames
- Enzo Iacchetti as Kak
- Massimo Lopez as Ramfis
- Elda Olivieri as Goa
- Mario Scarabelli as Kanak
- Giorgio Melazzi as Raz
- Vittorio Bestoso as Satam
- Gianni Gaude as Amonasro
- Olivia Manescalchi as Amneris (voice) / Helena Hellwig as Amneris (sing)
- Ciro Imparato as Diaspron
- Michele Di Mauro as Moud
- Gino Lana as Uzi

== Production ==
This Italian musical adventure fantasy animated film was produced by Lanterna Magica in Turin, Italy. Based on an original story created and developed by director Guido Manuli, it uses both traditional animation (2D animation) and computer animation (3D animation) with Adobe After Effects (compositing and visual effects), Adobe Photoshop (background art), Autodesk Maya (compositing, computer animation and modeling), Autodesk Softimage (computer animation and sculpting), Avid Media Composer (video editing), oil-paint and paper (background art and oil-painting animation), Pegs (compositing, digital ink and paint and traditional animation), pencil and paper (hand-drawn animation and storyboards), Softimage 3D (computer animation and sculpting) and Toonz Premium (compositing, digital ink and paint and traditional animation).
