= Southpaw =

Southpaw, a colloquial term for a left-handed individual, particularly in sports, may also refer to:

== Arts and entertainment ==
=== Film ===
- Southpaw (film), a 2015 film starring Jake Gyllenhaal
- Southpaw: The Francis Barrett Story, a 1999 documentary film about boxer Francie Barrett

=== Literature ===
- Southpaw (comics), a fictional character in the Marvel comic She-Hulk
- The Southpaw, a 1953 novel by Mark Harris

=== Music ===
- Southpaw (album), by Gilbert O'Sullivan, 1977
- Southpaw: Original Motion Picture Soundtrack, an album by James Horner, 2015
- Southpaw: Music from and Inspired by the Motion Picture, an album by various artists, 2015
- "Southpaw" (Pink Lady song), 1978
- "Southpaw", a song by the Afghan Whigs from Up in It, 1990
- "Southpaw", a song by Morrissey from Southpaw Grammar, 1995

== Sports ==
- Southpaw stance, the normal stance for a left-handed boxer
- Southpaw (Chicago White Sox mascot)

== Other uses ==
- Southpaw Technology, an open-source software company
- Southpaw Entertainment, a film and television production company founded by Richard B. Lewis
- Southpaw, a NODAL-related gene involved in left-right body patterning in vertebrates
