= USAnimation =

American animation studio (1986–2003)

VirtualMagic Animation, Inc.
- Formerly: Whitney/Demos Productions (1986–88); Optomystic (1988–90); Digital Animation Laboratories (1991); USAnimation (1992–96)
- Type: Private
- Industry: Digital 2D animation
- Predecessor: Digital Productions
- Founded: July 14, 1986; 40 years ago
- Founder: John Whitney Jr. Gary Demos
- Defunct: 2003; 23 years ago
- Headquarters: Hollywood, Los Angeles, California, U.S. (1986–88, 1991–97); Culver City, California, U.S. (1988–90); North Hollywood, Los Angeles, California, U.S. (1997–2003)
- Key people: Don Spielvogel (president)
- Subsidiaries: VirtualMagic Asia
- Website: Official website (archived)

VirtualMagic Animation, Inc. (previously known as USAnimation, Inc.) was an American traditional animation studio and software development company based out of Los Angeles, California. The studio produced animation for television series and commercials, and provided ink and paint services to animated TV series such as The Ren & Stimpy Show and The Simpsons and films such as We're Back! A Dinosaur's Story. Its software division was best known for developing USAnimation, a high-end software package designed to facilitate the traditional animation process using digital technologies.

== History ==
John Whitney Jr. and Gary Demos worked at Digital Productions, which was bought out by Omnibus Computer Graphics in June 1986. Whitney and Demos filed a complaint against Digital, Omnibus, Ramtek, and others in June, claiming that their rights as minority shareholders of DP were breached in the Omnibus sale. In July, they were locked out of their offices and founded Whitney/Demos Productions. Omnibus alleged to a court that Whitney and Demos, who were still paid under their contracts, founded a new competitor, hired at least three Omnibus employees, and used software and other property that belonged to Omnibus. The court temporarily ordered Whitney and Demos to return certain property to Omnibus.

Tom McMahon from Symbolics' Graphics Division and other private investors provided funding assistance for W/D. The following year, W/D purchased the Thinking Machines Connection Machine 2, fronted by Symbolics workstations with programming done in LISP. W/D's first project had them work with Symbolics' Graphics Division to produce the short film Stanley and Stella: Breaking the Ice. Before they could collect the rest of an initial $5 million loan, much of the CG production industry collapsed because of Omnibus's failed growth plan, and investors balked. After W/D declared bankruptcy in June 1988, Demos formed his own research company, DemoGraFX, while Whitney stayed and took the company through bankruptcy proceedings. Whintey continued the company with Karl Sims as Optomystic. When another company was found to have a similar name, Optomystic's name was changed to Digital Animation Laboratories.

Whitney developed a "paperless" animation process where animation drawn on paper was scanned into a computer to be colored and composited. He founded USAnimation in early 1992 with David Lipman as vice president and executive producer after he decided to use his technology to change how animation was produced. The animation industry was immediately receptive to this concept since digital capabilities were a powerful creative tool for the animation producer to improve the look of shows and do it more efficiently. USAnimation completed episodic projects such as Beavis and Butt-Head, The Ren & Stimpy Show and the first digitally colored episodes of The Simpsons, as well as commercial projects ranging from Lucky Charms cereal to Levi's jeans. In 1995, USAnimation began offering its digital animation system to other customers.

In 1996, USAnimation sold its software development business to Canadian competitor Toon Boom Technologies and its animation production services were renamed VirtualMagic USA. Toon Boom continues development of the USAnimation software, today known as Harmony. VirtualMagic International Productions, Inc., founded in Vancouver a year prior, signed a letter of intent to acquire USAnimation's Production Services Division on August 30 and closed the deal on October 31. VirtualMagic would continue to operate the company while expanding its production capacity to include CGI animation and significantly increasing employment. With resources now dedicated solely to its production expertise, VirtualMagic USA diversified itself by taking on a significant amount of interactive CD-ROM work for clients such as Disney Interactive, Broderbund, and Digital Domain.

In late-1997, the company completed changing its name to VirtualMagic Animation and moved into a new production space in the San Fernando Valley. In order to economically compete in the animated episodic series and motion picture market, VirtualMagic Animation evaluated potential affiliate foreign animation companies with digital capabilities as well as joint venture possibilities. In 1999, VirtualMagic Animation and ImagineAsia Studio formed VirtualMagic Asia, a digital ink, paint and compositing service based in Manila, Philippines. In 2003, Don Spielvogel and the company's investors put up VirtualMagic Animation for sale due to the changing dynamics of the United States' animation industry and its non-animation industry investors wishing to move on. VirtualMagic Animation and VirtualMagic Asia closed the same year.

== Filmography ==
- Various commercials for Acme Filmworks, Duck Soup Produckions, J.J. Sedelmaier Productions, Klasky Csupo, MTV Animation, Renegade Animation, Spaff Animation Incorporated, Spümcø, Warner Bros. Animation, and Wild Brain
- Stanley and Stella in: Breaking the Ice (1987) (short film co-produced with Symbolics)
- The Earth Day Special (1990) (special effects)
- Captain Planet and the Planeteers (1990) (main title digital scene simulation)
- The Ren & Stimpy Show (5 episodes)
- Beavis and Butt-Head (29 episodes)
- We're Back! A Dinosaur's Story (additional electronic ink & paint/digital compositing)
- David Macaulay: Roman City
- The Simpsons ("Radioactive Man" and "The Simpsons 138th Episode Spectacular")
- The Nanny ("Oy to the World")
- The Real Adventures of Jonny Quest ("In the Realm of the Condor")
- Gargoyles: The Goliath Chronicles (main title)
- Jumanji (main title)
- Hey Arnold! (main title)
- Love Rollercoaster (music video)
- Extreme Ghostbusters (main title)
- One Saturday Morning ("Great Minds Think for Themselves" shorts)
- Channel Umptee-3 (main title)
- Men in Black: The Series (main title)
- Cartoon Sushi
- Oh Yeah! Cartoons ("Planet Kate")
- Godzilla: The Series
- CatDog ("Fetch")
- Big Guy and Rusty the Boy Robot (main title)
- Boo Boo Runs Wild
- The Tigger Movie (additional ink and paint)
- Joseph: King of Dreams (digital painting)
- Freddy Got Fingered (animation coloring and compositing)
- The Cartoon Cartoon Show ("Captain Sturdy: Back in Action!")
- Harvey Birdman, Attorney at Law (episodes 2-6; digital composite)
- The Powerpuff Girls Movie
- Lenny & Sid ("Love Thy Neighbor/All Hands on Deck"; color styling)

Video games

- Wanna Be A Dino Finder
- Disney's Animated Storybook: 101 Dalmatians (sing-along digital ink and paint)
- Nightmare Ned (ink and paint)
- 101 Dalmatians: Escape from DeVil Manor (graphics)
- Carmen Sandiego Word Detective (ink and paint)
- Disney's Hercules (ink and paint)
- Living Books: Arthur's Computer Adventure (ink and paint)
- Rugrats Adventure Game
- The Curse of Monkey Island

=== VirtualMagic Asia ===
- God, the Devil and Bob
- Adventures from the Book of Virtues ("Humility" and "Compassion: Part 1")
- Harvey Birdman, Attorney at Law (episodes 2-6; digital ink and paint)

== See also ==
- Toon Boom Technologies, which acquired USAnimation's software development business
- Cambridge Animation Systems
- Pegs'n Co
- Toonz, another prolific animation software used by the 2D industry in the 1990s and 2000s
- Computer Animation Production System (CAPS), used by Disney from the 1990s to the mid-2000s
- Adobe Flash
- List of 2D animation software
