= Macromedia Flash =

Macromedia Flash may refer to:

- Adobe Animate, a multimedia authoring and computer animation program formerly known as Macromedia Flash
- Adobe Flash, a multimedia software platform formerly known as Macromedia Flash
