= Flash animation =

Animation technique made using Adobe Flash

Simple animation in Flash MX: a square moving across the screen in a motion tween, one of the basic functions of Flash; onion skinning is used to show the apparent motion of the square

Adobe Flash animation (formerly Macromedia Flash animation and FutureSplash animation) is an animation that is created with the Adobe Animate (formerly Flash Professional) platform or similar animation software and often distributed in the SWF file format. The term Adobe Flash animation refers to both the file format and the medium in which the animation is produced. Adobe Flash animation has enjoyed mainstream popularity since the mid-2000s, with many Adobe Flash-animated television series, television commercials, and award-winning online shorts being produced since then.

In the late 1990s, when bandwidth was still at 56 kbit/s for most Internet users, many Adobe Flash animation artists employed limited animation or cutout animation when creating projects intended for web distribution. This allowed artists to release shorts and interactive experiences well under 1 MB, which could stream both audio and high-end animation.

Adobe Flash is able to integrate bitmaps and other raster-based art, as well as video, though most Adobe Flash films are created using only vector-based drawings, which often result in a somewhat clean graphic appearance. Some hallmarks of poorly produced Adobe Flash animation are jerky natural movements (seen in walk-cycles and gestures), auto-tweened character movements, lip-sync without interpolation and abrupt changes from front to profile view.

Adobe Flash animations are typically distributed by way of the World Wide Web, in which case they are often referred to as Internet cartoons, online cartoons, or web cartoons. Web Adobe Flash animations may be interactive and are often created in a series. An Adobe Flash animation is distinguished from a webcomic, which is a comic strip distributed via the Web, rather than an animated cartoon.

== History ==
The first prominent use of the Adobe Flash animation format was by The Ren & Stimpy Show creator John Kricfalusi. On October 15, 1997, he launched The Goddamn George Liquor Program, the first cartoon series produced specifically for the Internet. The series starred George Liquor (a fictional character rumored to have ended Kricfalusi's employment on Ren & Stimpy) and his dim-witted nephew Jimmy The Idiot Boy. Later, Kricfalusi produced more animated projects with Adobe Flash Professional, including several online shorts for Icebox.com, television commercials, and a music video. Soon after that, web cartoons began appearing on the Internet with more regularity.

On February 26, 1999, in a major milestone for Adobe Flash animation, the popular web series WhirlGirl became the first regularly scheduled Adobe Flash animated web series when it premiered on the premium cable channel Showtime in an unprecedented telecast and simultaneous release on the Showtime website. Created by David B. Williams and produced by Visionary Media, the studio he founded, WhirlGirl follows the adventures of a young super-heroine fighting for freedom in a future ruled by an all-powerful "mediatech empire". The series originally launched in the spring of 1997 as a web comic with limited animation and sound. After gaining online syndication partners including Lycos and WebTV, the series first adopted Adobe Flash animation in July 1998. Following her Showtime debut, the titular heroine appeared in over 50 Adobe Flash webisodes on the Showtime website and starred in a million-dollar multimedia Showtime marketing campaign.

About the same time, Joe Cartoon launched the interactive animation "Frog in a Blender" to become one of the first true "viral hits" on the Internet.

The Von Ghouls went live in November 1999, featuring the first music group with cartoon episodes online including original songs, in the vein of Saturday morning cartoons of the 1970s. A number of popular portal sites featured Adobe Flash animation during the dot-com boom of the late 1990s, including MondoMedia, Icebox, CampChaos, MediaTrip, Bogbeast and AtomFilms. Stan Lee, the late founder of Marvel Comics, launched an animated comics site.

The Internet also saw the proliferation of many websites devoted entirely to Flash cartoons. Some of the shows from that period made the transition to traditional media, including Queer Duck, Gary the Rat, Happy Tree Friends, and the politically-minded JibJab shorts. Occasionally, the trend has been reversed: after being canceled from both ABC and Fox, Atom Films and Flinch Studio created net-only episodes of The Critic in 2000–2001. In another instance, Adobe Flash almost made the transition to the big screen. In 2001, production began on what would have been the first Adobe Flash-animated feature film, the ill-fated Lil' Pimp, which also began life as an Internet series. As potentially controversial as its subject matter was, it had a relatively large budget, a number of well-known actors (including William Shatner, the late Bernie Mac, and Lil' Kim), a full crew, and a running time of nearly 80 minutes. Although Sony Pictures decided not to release the film, it was eventually released on DVD by Lionsgate.

In 2000, another major milestone occurred in the world of animation when the first broadcast-quality Adobe Flash animation aired on television. Dice Raw's music video "Thin Line between Raw and Jiggy" appeared on the big screen at Resfest 2000, on television via BET, and the Web on sites such as Sputnik7.com, Shockwave.com, Heavy.com and was also included with the CD. Its creation became one of media history's first convergent entertainment productions. Todd Wahnish, who would later go on to create Marvel Entertainment's "All Winners Squad", pioneered the early conversion of traditional hand-drawn techniques into vector-based animation seen in the video. The video triggered a flood of Adobe Flash-based television animation.

Several recording companies experimented with releasing animated music videos to promote their artists' releases online, including Madonna, Beastie Boys and Tenacious D; however, none became the hit that allowed for the expansion of Flash animated music videos. Adam Sandler and Tim Burton, among others, released original Internet-only animated works, but were not able to devise successful financial models and the trend dissipated, largely as a result of a lack of viable micropayment systems.

Several popular online series were produced in Adobe Flash Professional, such as the Emmy Award-winning Off-Mikes, produced by ESPN and Animax Entertainment; Gotham Girls and Lobo, produced by Warner Bros.; Crime Time, produced by Future Thought Productions and Homestar Runner produced by Mike and Matt Chapman.

Many animated television series were produced using Macromedia Flash, inspired by both the comparatively low cost of production and the unique arrays of new animation styles that can be achieved through the medium, including Metalocalypse, Being Ian, Foster's Home for Imaginary Friends, Kappa Mikey, Hi Hi Puffy AmiYumi, Happy Tree Friends, The Buzz on Maggie, Astroblast!, Odd Job Jack, Little Einsteins, Wow! Wow! Wubbzy!, The Powerpuff Girls, Total Drama, the BBC Three show Monkey Dust, the Channel Four show Modern Toss, the CBBC show The Secret Show, Yin Yang Yo!, Alejo & Valentina, Aaagh! It's the Mr. Hell Show, Jake and the Never Land Pirates, The Mr. Men Show, My Little Pony: Friendship Is Magic on The Hub (Note: Renamed Hub Network in 2013, and later Discovery Family from October 13, 2014, onward.) (however, this show uses a heavily modified version of Flash 8), Cinemax's Eli's Dirty Jokes, Queer Duck from Showtime, The Mr. Peabody and Sherman Show on Netflix, ToddWorld on Discovery Kids, Smiling Friends on Adult Swim and Shorties Watching Shorties on Comedy Central.

Other TV shows, such as Home Movies, Harvey Birdman, Attorney at Law and Ballmastrz: 9009, broadcast on Cartoon Network's Adult Swim programming block, switched to Adobe Flash Professional from other animation technology and on Disney XD with Kick Buttowski: Suburban Daredevil.

Many animation film festivals responded to the popularity of Adobe Flash animation by adding separate categories in competition for "web cartoons" or "Internet cartoons". Additionally, several exclusively web-based Adobe Flash competitions have been established. It is speculated that only the category "made for Internet" will survive, as competitions at animation film festivals are typically arranged in categories defined by film length and distribution channel, rather than by animation techniques or tools used to create it.

Adobe Flash Professional was rebranded to Adobe Animate in 2016 to both more accurately reflect its market position then, since over a third of all content created in Animate uses HTML5, and prevent confusion between Adobe Flash Professional and Adobe Flash Player since they are completely different products. Adobe will continue to support Adobe Animate even after Flash Player's end-of-life deadline by 2020, hence all animations produced in Animate will survive Flash Player's death. The only change is that after 2020, animators will instead share their animations in either video, HTML5, or WebGL format. On June 16, 2020, as part of Adobe's 'Evolving Brand Identity', Adobe Animate unveiled a complete redesign of its logo in which for the first time in almost 20 years, the main color was changed from Red to Purple, ending any association of Flash entirely.

== Distribution ==
While the creation of animation using Adobe Animate can be much easier and less expensive than traditional animation techniques, the amount of time, money, and skill required to produce a project using the software depends on the chosen content and style. Internet distribution is considerably easier and less expensive than television broadcasting. Many Adobe Flash animations are created by individual, independent artists, and many that are first distributed on the web became popular enough to be broadcast on television, particularly on such networks as MTV and G4.

== Professional studios ==
Adobe Flash animation production is enjoying considerable popularity in major animation studios around the world, as animators take advantage of the software's ability to organize a large number of assets (such as characters, scenes, movements, and props) for later re-use. Because Adobe Animate files are in vector file format, they can be used to transfer animation to 35 mm film without any compromise in image quality. In 2003, Big Idea Entertainment used Animate (back when it was called Flash) to make Larryboy: The Cartoon Adventures. This feature is used by several independent animators worldwide, including Phil Nibbelink, who saw his 77-minute feature film Romeo & Juliet: Sealed with a Kiss released in theaters in 2006, and Nina Paley, who released Sita Sings the Blues in 2008. For Disneyland's 50 Magical Years film featuring Live action Steve Martin interacting with Donald Duck, the hand drawn animation of Donald Duck was cleaned up and colored in Flash. The Drawn Together Movie: The Movie!, a straight-to-DVD feature of the animated series Drawn Together, produced by Comedy Central and released in April 2010, discarded the series' traditional animation and used Flash animation instead.

== Creating Flash animations using other software ==
There are a number of other software packages available that can create output in the .swf format. Among these are Vyond (2007-2019), Toon Boom, Xara Photo & Graphic Designer, Serif DrawPlus, Toufee, Express Animator, CelAction 2D and Moho. These front-ends often provide additional support for creating cartoons, especially with tools more tailored to traditionally trained animators, as well as additional rigging for characters, which can speed up character animation considerably.

== See also ==
- Animutation
- CSS Animations
- SVG animation
- List of animated Internet series
- List of Adobe Flash animated television series
- List of Adobe Flash animated films
