= Ciro Imparato =

Italian psychologist, actor, announcer and writer

- Born: 15 December 1962; Turin, Italy
- Died: 18 March 2015 (aged 52); Turin, Italy
- Occupation(s): Psychologist, voice actor, actor, announcer and writer

Ciro Imparato (15 December 1962 – 18 March 2015) was an Italian psychologist, voice actor, actor, announcer and writer.

== Works ==
- Il manuale del lettore, 1997 Elledici, ISBN 978-88-01-00894-4
- La tua voce può cambiarti la vita, 2009 Sperling&Kupfer, ISBN 978-88-200-4719-1
- La voce verde della calma, 2013 Sperling&Kupfer, ISBN 978-88-6061-868-9
- Solo applausi, 2013 Sperling&Kupfer, ISBN 978-88-200-5413-7

== Acknowledgments ==
- Melvin Jones Fellow "For Lions Dedicated Humanitarian Services Lions Clubs International Foundation" awarded by the Torino Sabauda Lions Club
- Audience Award at the 6th edition of the Leggio d'Oro (2009)

== TV and radio conduction ==
- ABC talk with the little ones (Sky Issue Easy Baby, from 2011 onwards)
- 24ore.tv, network entry
- Network4, network entry
- Open Studio – The Day (Italy1)
- Frontiers of the Spirit (Channel 5)

== Dubbing ==
Former student of Center D – Scuola di Dizione, dubbing and adaptation of dialogues, he was a member of the Association of Advertising Actors Doppers.

=== Television ===
- Dragon Ball Z (Elder wise)
- Donkey Kong Country (Inka Dinka Doo)
- Max Steel (Durham)

=== Animated film ===
- Aida degli alberi (Diaspron)

=== Videogames ===
- Microsoft Flight Simulator X
- Sly Raccoon (Panda King)
- Soulbringer (Barthelago)
- Imperivm (Ogox; Degedyc; Dahram; Thoric; Rulinix; Vigorius)
- Crash Nitro Kart (Tiny Tiger; Imperatore Velo)
- Sacred Underworld (Gargaduk; Subkari Ceriri; Fingoniel)
- Command & Conquer: Generals (Cannone quadruplo; Lanciatore Scud; Dirottatore)
- Mortal Kombat – Shaolin Monks (Scorpion; Jax Briggs; Voce narrante)
- Max Payne 2 – The Fall of Max Payne
- Warcraft III – Reign of Chaos (Mal'Ganis; Re dei Lich; Sciamano; Ombra; Emissario; Lavoratore)
- Aliens vs. Predator 2 (Duke)
- Ty the Tasmanian Tiger (Nandu-Kili; Ranger Ken)
- God of War II (Re arbaro, Atlante)
- The Hobbit (Bombur)
- Stranglehold (Vladimir Zakarov)
- Aida degli alberi (Diaspron)
- Syphon Filter 2 (Vincent Hadden, Derek Falkan)
- Syphon Filter 3 (Vincent Hadden)
- Steel 2000 (Durham)
- Age of Mythology
- The Movies (DJ Randy Shaw)
