= Adobe Animate =

Animation software made by Adobe

- A screenshot of Adobe Animate running on Windows
- Original authors: FutureWave; Macromedia
- Developer: Adobe
- Release: May 1996; 30 years ago
- Stable release: 2026 (27.0.1) / November 7, 2026; 12 days ago
- Written in: C++, ActionScript, JavaScript
- Operating system: Windows 10 v20H2 and later macOS 11.7.7 "Big Sur" and later
- Platform: x64
- Available in: 16 languages
- List of languages American English, Arabic, Chinese (simplified), Chinese (traditional), Czech, Dutch, French, German, Hebrew, Italian, Japanese, Korean, Polish, Portuguese, Russian, Spanish, Swedish and Turkish
- Type: Multimedia
- License: Trialware, Proprietary, term
- Website: adobe.com/products/animate.html

Adobe Animate (formerly Adobe Flash Professional, Macromedia Flash, and FutureSplash Animator) is a multimedia authoring and computer animation program developed by Adobe.

Animate is used to design vector graphics and animation for television series, online animation, websites, web applications, rich web applications, game development, commercials, and other interactive projects. The program also offers support for raster graphics, rich text, audio video embedding, and ActionScript 3.0 scripting. Animations may be published for HTML5, WebGL, Scalable Vector Graphics (SVG) animation and spritesheets, and legacy Flash Player (SWF) and Adobe AIR formats. The developed projects also extend to applications for Android, iOS, Windows Desktop and MacOS.

It was first released in 1996 as FutureSplash Animator, and then renamed Macromedia Flash upon its acquisition by Macromedia. It served as the main authoring environment for the Adobe Flash platform, vector-based software for creating animated and interactive content. It was renamed Adobe Animate in 2016 to more accurately reflect its market position then, since over a third of all content created in Animate uses HTML5 Canvas.

On February 2, 2026, Adobe announced that it would discontinue sales of Adobe Animate on March 1, 2026, with existing users being able to use the software until the end of support on March 1, 2029. Following major public backlash, Adobe reversed course the next day and announced it would instead remain indefinitely in "maintenance mode", in which Animate would continue to be supported and remain available for purchase but would no longer receive content updates.

== History ==
=== Origins and early years (1990s–2000s) ===
The first version of Adobe Flash/Adobe Animate was FutureSplash Animator, a vector graphics and vector animations program released in May 1996. FutureSplash Animator was developed by FutureWave Software, a small software company whose first product, SmartSketch, was a vector-based drawing program for pen-based computers. With the implosion of the pen-oriented operating systems, it was ported to Microsoft Windows as well as Apple Inc.'s Classic Mac OS. In 1995, the company decided to add animation abilities to their product and to create a vector-based animation platform for World Wide Web; hence FutureSplash Animator was created. (At that time, the only way to deploy such animations on the web was through the use of Java.) The FutureSplash animation technology was used on websites such as MSN, The Simpsons website and Disney Daily Blast of The Walt Disney Company.

In December 1996, Macromedia bought FutureWave and rebranded the product as Macromedia Flash, a brand name that continued for 8 major versions. Adobe Systems acquired Macromedia in 2005, and re-branded the product Adobe Flash Professional to distinguish it from the player, Adobe Flash Player. It was included as part of the Creative Suite of products from CS3 to CS6, until Adobe phased out the Creative Suite lineup in favor of Creative Cloud (CC).

=== 2010–2025 ===
On December 1, 2015, Adobe announced that the program would be renamed Adobe Animate on its next major update. The move came as part of an effort to disassociate the program from Adobe Flash Player, acknowledging its increased use for authoring HTML5 Canvas and video content, and an effort to begin discouraging the use of Flash Player in favor of web standards-based solutions. The first version under the new name was released February 8, 2016.

On June 16, 2020, as part of Adobe's 'Evolving Brand Identity', Adobe Animate unveiled a complete redesign of its logo in which, for the first time in almost 20 years, the main color was changed—from red to purple; several other applications within Adobe's product lineup that involved audio-video editing, animation, and VFX creation also had their main colors changed to purple as a result of the aforementioned redesign.

Although Adobe Animate was moving towards web-standard file formats, Flash (.swf) and AIR (.air) formats are still officially supported.

=== Initial plans for discontinuation ===
On February 2, 2026, Adobe announced that it would discontinue downloads for Adobe Animate as of March 1, 2026. Technical support and the ability to download content would be available for end users until March 1, 2027, with support for enterprise customers continuing until March 1, 2029. However, despite this discontinuation, the software would continue to function.

This decision generated negative reactions from users and calls to make the discontinued Adobe Animate open source, because Adobe Animate was still widely used at the time of the announcement. Due to major public backlash, one day later, Adobe backtracked their decision and put the software in "maintenance mode", meaning new features will no longer be introduced, but bug fixes will still be occasionally pushed out.

Despite placing Adobe Animate in "maintenance mode", Adobe would release Animate 27.0 on November 7, 2026. Contradicting their previous statement, this release of Animate introduces a new feature called "Turntable", which is the first AI powered feature introduced to the software. It also includes several critical library updates and reliability improvements.

== Similar products ==
- FlipaClip
- Toon Boom Harmony
- TVPaint
- OpenToonz
- Pencil2D
- Moho
- Synfig Studio
- Blender (Grease Pencil)
- Krita
- Clip Studio Paint

== See also ==
- Flash animation
- List of 2D graphics software
- List of Adobe Flash animated television series
- List of Adobe Flash animated films
- Vyond
