= Jabu's Jungle =

South African-produced animated series

Jabu's Jungle is a South African-produced animated adventure series aimed at children between ages four and seven. It follows Jabu, an intrepid nine-year-old, and his magic talking drum as they explore the jungle and help animals in need. It is distributed by Gulli Africa in 22 African countries. The series became the most watched local children's show within six weeks of broadcast on SABC1, taking over from established shows such as Takalani Sesame and YoTV as the most popular amongst 4-14 year olds. It has also been broadcast in an additional 17 countries by Econet Media and series 2 was ready for broadcast for 2017.
