= RETAS =

2D animation software

- Developer: Celsys
- Initial release: September 1993; 32 years ago
- Stable release: RETAS STUDIO / December 19, 2008; 17 years ago
- Operating system: Microsoft Windows, macOS
- License: Proprietary
- Website: www.retasstudio.net

RETAS (Revolutionary Engineering Total Animation System) is a 2D animation software bundle developed and sold by Celsys that is available for Microsoft Windows and Mac OS X. It handles the entire animation production from digitally drawing or tracing to exporting in Flash and QuickTime, and is considered to be a leader in Japan's anime industry including Toei Animation. RETAS was later succeeded by Clip Studio Paint.

Sales ended in 2015, and official forum support ended in November 2019.

== RETAS! PRO HD Series ==
RETAS! PRO HD is the most current software being offered to the English-speaking community through Celsys. It is sold as four different pieces of software in which each handles a specific task in the animation process.

=== Stylos HD ===
Stylos is a vector and raster graphics editor used to draw the key frames and inbetweens of a scene. Designed to work with a graphics tablet as an alternative to paper, it is capable of multi-layer editing, onion skinning, and advanced vector editing.

=== TraceMan HD ===
TraceMan is scanning software which supports vector tracing and 48-bit image scanning. Created to convert hand drawings into line art, it is an alternative to the paperless Stylos editor.

=== PaintMan HD ===
PaintMan is a coloring utility designed to color images created in either Stylos or TraceMan.

=== CoreRETAS HD ===
CoreRETAS is a rendering utility which allows one to set up a scene and render it as an animation, following a process similar to the traditional shooting of cels and backgrounds with an animation camera. The software features various functionality such as panning, multiplane effects, moving images, and exporting. Some of the most commonly supported formats are Flash, QuickTime, and AVI (Windows Only).

== RETAS Studio ==
On December 18, 2008, Celsys introduced a new version of RETAS entitled RETAS STUDIO to the Japanese-speaking audience. RETAS STUDIO is Celsys's latest and competitively-priced animation software that incorporates the entire RETAS suite (Stylos, TraceMan, PaintMan, and CoreRETAS) into a single package.

== Release History ==
- RETAS! PRO 1.0 (Released September 1993)
- RETAS! PRO 2.0 (Released February 1995)
- RETAS! PRO 3.0 (Released September 1996)
- RETAS! PRO 4.0 (Released February 1998)
- RETAS! PRO 5.0 (Released August 1999)
- RETAS! PRO Infinity (Released August 6, 2001, included CD-ROM with the official guidebook)
- RETAS! LITE (Released August 10, 2001)
- RETAS! LITE Debut (Released March 14, 2003)
- RETAS! PRO HD Series
  - Stylos HD, TraceMan HD, PaintMan HD (Released September 9, 2005), CoreRETAS HD (Released July 7, 2006)
- RETAS STUDIO (Released December 19, 2008)
