= Southpaw Technology =

US software company

- Industry: Digital asset management; Feature film production; Visual effects; Post production; Video game development; 3D animation; Project management software; Business intelligence
- Founded: 2005
- Headquarters: Toronto, Ontario, Canada
- Key people: Gary Mundell, CEO, Co-Founder; Remko Noteboom, Chief Technology Officer, Co-Founder; David Lowe, President, COO
- Products: TACTIC
- Website: Southpaw Technology

Southpaw Technology is a commercial, open-source software company that provides products, professional services and technical support for TACTIC. Founded in 2005 by Gary Mundell and Remko Noteboom, Southpaw Technology originally developed TACTIC to facilitate project management, workflow and digital asset management for production pipelines in feature films, television series and game projects. As TACTIC's technology developed and expanded, Southpaw shifted into providing solutions for enterprise content management. Southpaw's client base now includes enterprise customers from many diverse industries, including media and entertainment, broadcasting, health care and defence. TACTIC has also started to gain attention as a Business Intelligence solution.

== Technology ==
Southpaw Technology develops and supports TACTIC, an enterprise web framework. TACTIC is available to download as open-source software under the Eclipse Public License for Mac OS X, Microsoft Windows and Linux. It is also available through a fully supported commercial license. As of summer 2013, TACTIC can be accessed as a hosted cloud service through Amazon Web Services Marketplace.TACTIC combines asset management, file system management, project management, workflow management, data management and web applications. Southpaw announced TACTIC 3.0 at SIGGRAPH 2010 in Los Angeles. Two years later Southpaw made the move to open-source, making TACTIC available to download for free under an Open Source Initiative and the Eclipse Public License. In May 2013, Southpaw released TACTIC version 4.0. In 2014, Southpaw released TACTIC version 4.3.

== Clients ==
As of April 2019, Southpaw's diverse client base includes Procter and Gamble, Turbine, Inc., Viacom, Nissan, Astral Media, Philips, Ubisoft, Blohm + Voss, Lockheed Martin, Legend3D, Adidas, Technicolor, Tegna, Transunion and Teague.

== See also ==
- Comparison of project management software
