= Wheel Squad =

- The main characters: Akim, Bob, Jessica and Johnny
- Genre: Adventure; Comedy drama Action
- Created by: Olivier Dehors
- Directed by: Jean-François Galataud
- Composer: Terra Sonica
- Countries of origin: France; Italy; Australia
- No. of seasons: 2
- No. of episodes: 39

Production
- Executive producers: Marie-Pierre Journet; Andy Evans
- Producer: Giovanna Milano
- Running time: 22 minutes
- Production companies: France Animation; Praxinos Animation; Rai Fiction; Energee Entertainment

Original release
- Network: M6 (France); RAI (Italy)
- Release: September 6, 2000 – 2002

Wheel Squad is an animated television series produced by France Animation, Praxinos Animation, Rai Fiction and Energee Entertainment. The show was broadcast on M6 in France between 2000 and 2002. 39 episodes were produced.

== Plot ==
Set in a large, dark metropolis, the protagonists Akim, Jessica, Bob and Johnny are four young geniuses who love extreme sports and together form the staff of the Wheel Squad. The four live in a neighborhood situated on a hill and are constantly in conflict with various villains trying to cause mayhem in the streets such as the trio of bandit bikers Snakes, or the greedy Enzo, assistant to Mr. Rotter who is the owner of rich company World Mart. There is also Emilie, the daughter of Mr. Rotter and Bob's girlfriend, who is an ally of Wheels and tries to make the team.

== Characters ==
=== Wheel Squad ===
- Akim Souab is the leader of the Wheel Squad. Akim also excels in roller skates. He has more siblings than any other member of the Wheel Squad and is the eldest child of his parents. His father owns the local grocery shop and he usually helps with the work there.
- Jessica is the second-in command and the only female (if not counting Emilie) of the Wheel Squad. She dreams about becoming an actress and works up that dream by acting and even directing school plays. Her father works in England and only made one appearance in the series. When her mother threatened to leave town for not having resources to fix her beauty parlour she pretended to date Akim (who is oblivious to the fact Jessica really loves him) so she would stay. She once entered an ice skating contest where she was taunted by girls who said she couldn't win for not being feminine. When the Wheel Squad boys couldn't say she was feminine and her mother scolded her saying she was in no condition to complain about that since she acts and dresses like a boy she reluctantly asks for Emilie's help. Her wheel specialty is roller skates.
- Bob Gueye is the black member of the group. He is the only member of the Wheel Squad who is not good at roller skates, which was noted mainly when they agreed to catch a burglar at World-Mart (they only agreed when the burglar robbed Jessica's Mom's beauty parlour which is located at World-Mart) and when they created a team of rollerball (each team needed four members) and they tried to encourage him saying they needed someone to miss the basket. He is an expert in mountain bikes.
- Johnny Pilleu is the skateboard expert of the group. He is an excellent artist, having once painted the school front wall to increase his grades so his parents would not send him to summer school.
- Émilie Potter is a rich girl who is friends with the Wheel Squad. She is a blonde who usually wears blue and can afford the fanciest things available since her stepfather is the wealthy owner of the World-Mart. She is spoiled and isn't good at any wheels, which consists the main reason she is usually not considered a member of the Wheel Squad despite her many attempts to join the gang. Jessica is the one who most despises the idea of Emilie joining the Wheel Squad and is the most reluctant whenever they need her help.

=== The Snakes ===
The Snakes are the local vandals of the show and are willing to do anything for money, even forcing little kids into their dirty schemes. They are Willy, Cactus and Alex.

- Willy is the leader of the group and is the one who comes up with the plans.
- Cactus is a short and skinny boy who is allergic to several things through the series. He once tried to counter this by covering his face with his shirt but it backfired when his friends couldn't understand a thing he said from inside the shirt.
- Alex is the seemingly dumbest member of the Snakes and wears a red jumpsuit with a matching cap.

In one episode Jessica had a crush on a boy who was later revealed to be a fourth Snake, who after that only returned to the series when the Snakes created a rollerball team and needed a fourth member.

=== Supporting ===
- Mr. Rotter is the owner of the World-Mart. He is a respected businessman and the stepfather of Emilie. He treats Emilie like they really were father and daughter. While she knows he isn't her biological father (who is never seen or heard of), as evidenced by the fact that she describes him as her stepfather whenever she mentions him in conversations with her friends, she calls him Dad. Mr. Rotter has a collection of ties he likes to the point of ironing them by himself rather than having anybody else touch them.
- Enzo is the manager of the World-Mart. He usually tries to take advantage of this position to score some dirty money, but the Wheel Squad foils his plans. Some of these plans include purchasing low-quality paint and secretly re-selling it when Mr. Rotter tells him to throw it away, thinking nobody wants to buy it. The plan meets an obstacle when Emilie, knowing that Johnny needs some paint for a school display, suggests Mr. Rotter to donate it in order to improve his public image.
- Hool and Igan are the followers of Enzo. They often have harmful plans of his boss and often persecute Wheel without success.
- Mr. Grunt is the grumpy neighbor of Wheels. He is very rude and is always accompanied by his pet dog Brutus, but in the end is not so bad and loves animals. His name is George.
- Rosalie is Jessica's elder aunt who lives alone in an apartment with the cat Marilyn. She works as an actress in an old movie.
- Sheeba is the owner of the laundry in the neighbourhood. She is a friend of the Wheel and is of Chinese heritage.
- Mr. and Mrs. Pukowiski are a neighbourhood elderly couple who are always in a rough fight and sometimes they are more grumpy than Mr. Grunt.
- Mr. Frank is a mathematics teacher of the Wheel. He helps them from time to time in some situations. His wife is Nadia and he has a daughter named Angela.
- Tom is the younger brother of Bob. He is very ingenuous and always tries to follow his brother in his adventures. He lives with his friends to make promises in exchange for bicycles.
- Akim has three brothers: Samir, Malik, and Arthur, and a sister named Lukya.
- Mr. Souab and Noria are Akim's parents. While she worked as a housewife, she also helps her husband in his grocery store. Noria always worries about their children when they are in danger.
- Tony is Bob and Tom's big brother. He works away from the hill and is not able to see his family except at Christmas. He has also been arrested once.
- Sarah was a skater girl who came to the team and was temporarily a robber at the World Mart because her mother was too poor to support her. Eventually Bob ends up unmasking and she ends up regretting what she did, but ends up getting a job at the World Mart to cover their losses.
- Matt is a very studious boy, but never likes sport until he meets Samir and makes friends with him, and together they face the Snakes.
- Alexandra is a girl with a wheelchair, who at first did not understand well with Akim and always arguing with him, but Akim helps her to escape from the Snakes to participate in a contest.

== Episodes ==
1. "Hands Off My Brother!"
2. "A Rolling Birthday"
3. "Seeing Is Believing"
4. "A High-Flying Match"
5. "Love On The Rocks"
6. "Nobody Loves Me"
7. "Water, Water Everywhere"
8. "Brutus Has Gone"
9. "Hero for a Day"
10. "The Rebel"
11. "In Gear for the School Year"
12. "Squab's Deadline"
13. "A Lesson in Courage"
14. "A Leading Role"
15. "Food For Thought"
16. "The Missing Lottery Ticket"
17. "One Great Girl"
18. "School Colours"
19. "The Guardian Angels"
20. "Stay on Track"
21. "The Big Break-In"
22. "The Champion"
23. "Chill Out On The Butte"
24. "A Snowy Homecoming"
25. "Beauty on Wheels"
26. "A Dad for Jessica"
27. "SOS Snakes"
28. "Father's Day Race"
29. "Stubborn As a Mule"
30. "Orangutan-Tang-Tang"
31. "A Tike, A Trike, A Fight"
32. "Operation Cinderella"
33. "Love on the Ice"
34. "Phantom of the Butte"
35. "Close Call"
36. "Emilie's Big Bash"
37. "Valentine"
38. "Hoa"
39. "On Your Skates! Get Set! Go!"

== Broadcasting ==
Wheel Squad aired on M6 in France starting in 2000. In Italy the series aired on Rai 3 and Rai Gulp, while in Germany it aired on kabel eins & ProSieben. In Spain the series aired on Fox Kids, Antena 3 and Clan. The English dub of Wheel Squad aired on CITV in the United Kingdom, Network 10 in Australia, and Disney Channel in Southeast Asia.
