= Toonz =

2D animation software

OpenToonz

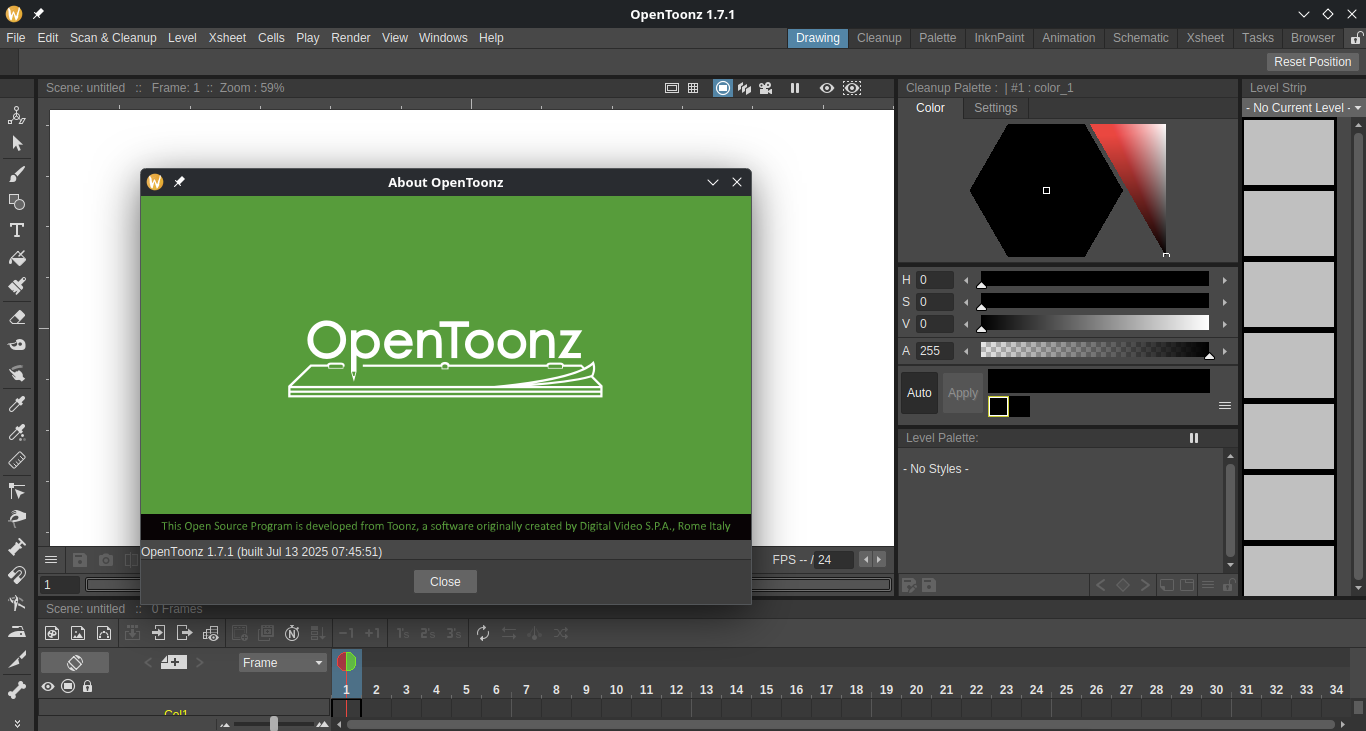
- Developer: Dwango
- Release: March 26, 2016; 10 years ago
- Stable release: 1.7.1 / May 9, 2023; 3 years ago
- Written in: C++ (Qt)
- Operating system: Linux, macOS, Microsoft Windows
- Platform: x86, x86-64
- Type: 2D animation software
- License: Open-source (BSD license)
- Website: opentoonz.github.io/e/
- Repository: github.com/opentoonz/opentoonz

Toonz Premium
- Developer: Digital Video S.p.a.
- Release: 1993; 33 years ago
- Stable release: 7.3
- Written in: C++ (Qt)
- Operating system: macOS, Microsoft Windows
- Platform: x86, x86-64
- Type: 2D animation software
- License: Proprietary
- Website: www.toonzpremium.com
- Repository: github.com/opentoonz/opentoonz

Toonz is a 2D animation software program. The base application is currently managed by Dwango as open-source software under the name OpenToonz. An extended commercial variant for professional individuals and studios, Toonz Premium, is being developed and marketed by Digital Video S.p.A. Toonz has been used by studios such as Studio Ghibli and Rough Draft Studios.

== Release history ==
=== Toonz 3.0 ===
Developed in 1993 for the IRIX operating system, Toonz was created and registered as a trademark. An exclusive distribution agreement was signed with Softimage, which distributed it as Creative Toonz. One year later, the product was used in some productions such as Amblimation's Balto.

=== Toonz 4.0 ===
After Microsoft acquired Softimage, Toonz was optimized to run on Windows so that it could be marketed as Microsoft Toonz. Toonz underwent improvements on the tools and user interface for traditional cel animators. New features included the Pencil Test module, the Palette Editor, the Xsheet, the Ink and Paint module, and the Flip module, as well as more customizability by adding separate modules for scanning and rendering.

=== Toonz 5.0 ===
Toonz 5.0 Harlequin now supported vector graphics, with continued support for raster graphics, either generated inside the program or scanned in from paper to allow users to step into paperless animation. Toonz was also made compatible with both Windows and Mac OS X for the first time.

=== Toonz 6.0 Harlequin and Bravo ===
Version 6.0 was made available as Toonz Harlequin, created in collaboration with Studio Ghibli, for traditional (with scanned graphics) and paperless animation workflows; and Toonz Bravo for paperless workflows only.

=== Toonz 6.3 ML ===
Version 6.3 ML ("ML" for "multi-language") introduced non-English language support. Other new features included raster-vector conversion, palette styles, and options for rendering image sequences and video clips. More specifically, Toonz Bravo 6.3 ML got animation libraries for characters and props; palettes with linked styles and smart color models; animation levels with numerically controlled transformation, links and dependencies among pegbars, cameras and table; visual effects, including a 2D particle engine; and batch rendering with render farms. Toonz Harlequin 6.3 ML also allowed paper drawings to be scanned, colorized, and refined within it.

=== Toonz 6.4 ML ===
Version 6.4 was still available as Toonz Harlequin and Toonz 6.4 Bravo!, with improvements on the Cleanup module and previewing, the new Black & White mode of scanning, editable DPI parameters, a new algorithm for the Raster-to-Vector Converter, the Interactive Color Editing and the Smart FX Schematic Editing.

=== Toonz 7.0 ===
Version 7.0 introduced new features such as mesh deformation with bones, the ECMAScript support for automation, new effects, drawing cleanup, symmetric backgrounds, 3D stereoscopic rendering among others.

=== Open-sourcing ===
On March 19, 2016, it was announced that Toonz would be released as free and open-source software as OpenToonz. The source code of OpenToonz was released under the BSD license to a GitHub repository on March 26, 2016. Digital Video will also continue to develop and market a Toonz Premium version. The source code has also been forked by other projects, such as Tahoma2D which focuses on ease of use, as well as a custom made version for the Morevna Project.

== Usage ==
=== For films and TV ===
- Princess Mononoke
- My Neighbors the Yamadas
- Spirited Away
- Howl's Moving Castle (film)
- Ponyo
- Arrietty
- Mary and the Witch's Flower (OpenToonz)
- The Boy and the Heron (OpenToonz)
- Balto
- Logobelly
- Anastasia
- Futurama
- SpongeBob SquarePants
- The Maxx
- Titan A.E.
- Aida of the Trees
- Asterix Conquers America
- Steven Universe
- Batman Ninja (OpenToonz)
- Promare (OpenToonz)
- Belle (2021 film) (OpenToonz)

=== For video games ===
- Discworld 2
- Claw
