= Flicker-free =

Flicker reduction of video display, often by frame doubling

Flicker-free is a term given to video displays, primarily cathode-ray tubes, operating at a high refresh rate to reduce or eliminate the perception of screen flicker. For standard-definition television, this involves operating at a 100 hertz (Hz) or 120 hertz rate to eliminate flicker, compared to common televisions that operate at 50 Hz (PAL/SÉCAM systems) or 60 Hz (NTSC), most simply done by displaying each field of interlaced video twice, rather than once. For computer displays, this is usually a refresh rate of 70–90 Hz, sometimes 100 Hz or higher. This should not be confused with motion interpolation, though the two may be combined.

Televisions operating at these frequencies are often labelled as being 100 or 120 Hz without using the words flicker-free in the description.

== Prevalence ==
The term is primarily used for impulsed displays such as CRTs and plasma, where input signal frequency and output flicker are identical. Especially televisions in 50 Hz countries (PAL or SÉCAM) and computer monitors from the 1990s and early 2000s – the 50 Hz rate of PAL/SÉCAM video (compared with 60 Hz NTSC video) and the relatively large computer monitors close to the viewer's peripheral vision across field of view make flicker most noticeable on these devices.

In digital sample and hold displays such as LCDs and OLEDs, unlike impulsed displays, any flicker is unrelated to both display refresh and source framerate. Contrary to popular belief, such displays are not necessarily flicker free, since many inferior designs introduce flicker through flaws such as fluorescent backlights, digital PWM dimming, or temporal dithering.

Even on absolutely flicker-free displays, it can be purposely reintroduced to fight otherwise unavoidable perceived blur in high motion content, and better conceal onscreen smearing from slow pixel response, through black frame insertion and/or backlight strobing. In such a case, faster, briefer, sharper flicker provides the same benefits as faster refresh on impulsed displays, though typically constrained by lower peak brightness and slower response of even the fastest HDR panels.

== Implementation ==
The goal is to display images sufficiently frequently to distance itself from the human flicker fusion threshold, and hence create a better impression of a constant (non-flickering) image.

In computer CRTs this consists of changing the vertical refresh rate of the signal produced in the video card (and in sync with this, the displayed image on the screen). This is limited by the bandwidth of the connection, bandwidth and vsync/hsync ranges of the monitor, maximum pixel clock of the RAMDAC, and mode setting required of the OS — for a given pixel clock speed, faster refresh (thus framerate) require lower spatial resolution or bit depth, and higher native content frame rates require that programs producing imagery recalculate their output more frequently. For these reasons, refresh rates above 90–100 Hz to reduce flicker are uncommon on computers — these rates are sufficient to eliminate flicker.

On television, this is more involved, as the source material has a fixed frame rate (and is also traditionally interlaced video, in which one-half of the scan lines of each frame are broadcast at a time). Most simply, the refresh rate can be (e.g.) doubled by simply displaying the same broadcast image twice in rapid succession, as is done with movie projectors (which display each frame of 24 FPS film two or more times) – in interlaced display scanning out each source field twice.

Typically, for interlaced content, deinterlacing is used, possibly combined with some amount of interpolation or other scaling, where rather than scanning the original fields twice, the fields are combined into artificial progressive frames, and the display operates in progressive scan.

Higher refresh rates, while they reduce flicker, can cause other problems. Simply redisplaying the source frames at an integer multiple rate (e.g.: 59.94 FPS @ 179.82 Hz) as film projectors do, will cause double/triple-images to be perceived by the brain, which looks similar to ghosting. If display refresh is not a perfectly evenly divisible multiple of the content origination frame rate (e.g. 24 FPS @ 59.94 Hz, as in 3:2 pulldown), particularly on fast moving images, judder is present, as some frames are displayed over more time than others. Finally, native high frame rate source material avoids both judder and double images while reducing flicker without display motion blur, on top of smoother motion and lower latency. If desired content is not available at higher framerates, motion interpolation has the same benefits, but must instead contend with synthetic artifacts inherent to the automatic inbetweening of artificial frames that did not exist in the source material.

== See also ==
- Flicker (screen)
- Flicker fusion threshold
- Soap opera effect
