= Black Shark =

Black Shark may refer to:

- Black Shark torpedo, a naval weapon
- Black Shark, a series of smartphones sold by Xiaomi, including:
  - Black Shark (phone)
  - Black Shark Helo
  - Black Shark 2
  - Black Shark 3
  - Black Shark 4
  - Black Shark 5
- Kamov Ka-50, a military helicopter
- Kitefin shark, a species of shark

== See also ==
- Black sharkminnow, a species of fish
