= Motion interpolation =

Form of video processing

Comparison of a slow down video without interframe interpolation (left) and with motion interpolation (right)

Motion interpolation, motion-compensated frame interpolation (MCFI), or frame generation, is a form of video processing in which intermediate film, video or animation frames are synthesized between existing ones by means of interpolation, in an attempt to make animation more fluid, to compensate for display motion blur, and for fake slow motion effects.

In computer animation, interpolation can also be a natural automated process similar to inbetweening, where each frame depicts objects moving fluidly between key frames.

== Hardware applications ==
=== Devices ===
Motion interpolation is a common, optional feature of various modern video devices such as HDTVs and AV receivers, aimed at increasing perceived framerate or alleviating display motion blur, a common problem on LCD flat-panel displays.

=== Difference from display framerate ===
A display's output refresh rate, input drive signal framerate, and original content framerate, are not always equivalent. In other words, a display capable of or operating at a high framerate does not necessarily mean that it can or must perform motion interpolation. For example, a TV running at 120 Hz and displaying 24 FPS content will simply display each content frame for five of the 120 display frames per second. This has no effect on the picture compared to 60 Hz other than eliminating the need for 3:2 pulldown and thus film judder as a matter of course (since 120 is evenly divisible by 24). Eliminating judder results in motion that is less "jumpy" and which matches that of a theater projector. Motion interpolation can be used to eliminate judder, but it is only necessary when targeting a framerate not evenly divisible.

=== Relationship to advertised display framerate ===
The advertised framerate of a specific display may refer to either the maximum number of content frames which may be displayed per second, or the number of times the display is refreshed in some way, irrespective of content. In the latter case, the actual presence or strength of any motion interpolation option may vary. In addition, the ability of a display to show content at a specific framerate does not mean that display is capable of accepting content running at that rate; TVs above 60 Hz do not accept a higher frequency signal from most or any sources, but rather use the extra refresh capability to eliminate judder, reduce ghosting, display stereoscopy, or create interpolated frames.

As an example, a TV may be advertised as "240 Hz", which would mean one of two things:

1. The TV can natively display 240 frames per second, and perform advanced motion interpolation which inserts between 2 and 8 new frames between existing ones (for content running at 60 FPS to 24 FPS, respectively). For active 3D, this framerate would be halved.
2. The TV is natively only capable of displaying 120 frames per second, and basic motion interpolation which inserts between 1 and 4 new frames between existing ones. Typically the only difference from a "120 Hz" TV in this case is the addition of a strobing backlight, which flickers on and off at 240 Hz, once after every 120 Hz frame. The intent of a strobing backlight is to increase the apparent response rate and thus reduce blur, which results in clearer motion. However, this technique has little to do with actual framerate. For active 3D, this framerate is halved, and no motion interpolation or pulldown functionality is typically provided. 600 Hz is an oft-advertised figure for plasma TVs, and while technically correct, it only refers to an inter-frame response time of 1.6 milliseconds. This significantly reduces blur and thus improves motion quality, but is unrelated to interpolation and content framerate. There are no consumer films shot at 600 frames per second, nor any realtime video processors capable of generating 576 interpolated frames per second.

== Software applications ==
=== Video playback software ===
Motion interpolation features are included with several video player applications.

- WinDVD uses Philips' TrimensionDNM for frame interpolation.
- PowerDVD uses TrueTheater Motion for interpolation of DVD and video files to up to 72 frame/s.
- Splash PRO uses Mirillis Motion² technology for up to Full HD video interpolation.
- DmitriRender uses GPU-oriented frame rate conversion algorithm with native DXVA support for frame interpolation.
- HopperRender is an optical flow frame interpolator DirectShow filter using OpenCL.
- Bluesky Frame Rate Converter is a DirectShow filter that can convert the frame rate using AMD Fluid Motion.
- SVP (SmoothVideo Project) comes integrated by default with MPC-HC; paid version can integrate with more players, including VLC.

=== Video editing software ===
Some video editing software and plugins offer motion interpolation effects to enhance digitally-slowed video. FFmpeg is a free software non-interactive tool with such functionality. Adobe After Effects has this in a feature called "Pixel Motion". AI software company Topaz Labs produces Video AI, a video upscaling application with motion interpolation. The effects plugin "Twixtor" is available for most major video editing suites, and offers similar functionality.

=== Neural networks ===
- Depth-Aware Video Frame Interpolation
- Channel Attention Is All You Need
- Real-Time Intermediate Flow Estimation
- Intermediate Feature Refine Network

=== Gaming ===
Intended for latency intolerant applications, especially games, some use additional metadata from deep inside the graphics pipeline to lessen artifacts or speed performance. Except for Nvidia's and Sony's, all are hardware-agnostic.

- DLSS Frame Generation from Nvidia
- Smooth Motion from Nvidia
- FSR Frame Generation from AMD
- Fluid Motion Frames from AMD
- XeSS Frame Generation from Intel
- PlayStation Spectral Super Resolution from Sony

Another form of interpolation is similar to the concept of inbetweening.

== Side effects ==
=== Visual artifacts ===
Especially on cheaper TV implementations, visual anomalies in the picture are more pronounced. Described by CNET's David Carnoy as a "little tear or glitch" in the picture, appearing for a fraction of a second. He adds that the effect is most noticeable when the technology suddenly kicks in during a fast camera pan. Television and display manufacturers refer to this phenomenon as a type of digital artifact. Due to the improvement of associated technology over time, such artifacts appear less obviously with higher-end and newer consumer TVs, though they will never be eliminated "the artifacts happens more often when the gap between frames are bigger".

=== Latency ===
Input lag for general purpose motion interpolation itself is usually ~10 ms, though some implementations are more than 80 ms, which for TVs (except on some Samsung sets) is further exacerbated by the need to disable game mode, imposing dozens to hundreds of ms of additional lag. All that is on top of the already poor lag inherent to most modern TVs even when optimally configured, compared to CRTs or gaming monitors. For dedicated gaming interpolation such as DLSS4 MFG, lag is 6-9 ms depending on multiplier, vastly dwarfed by the added lag of a slower internal render framerate. Prototype techniques, similar to those already deployed in some asynchronous reprojection for virtual reality, could cut overhead well below 1 ms, even when generating thousands of frames.

=== Soap opera effect ===
Some opposition against motion interpolation has arisen not because of artifacts, but from a dislike of fluidity itself in some or all content, whether synthetic or native. Because cheaper TV programs such as soap operas tended to be shot in 60 Hz, whereas more prestigious works such as theatrical movies tended to be filmed in 24 FPS, high frame rate has a "soap opera effect" for critics.

== See also ==
- Inbetweening – Animation technique that creates intermediate frames
- Motion compensation – Video compression technique, used to efficiently predict and generate video frames
- Motion interpolation (computer graphics) – Animation technique that creates transitions between motions
- Flicker-free – Flicker reduction of video display, often by frame doubling
- Television standards conversion – Process of changing one type of television system to another
- 3:2 pulldown – Post-production process of transferring film to video
