= High-motion =

High frame rate video

High-motion is the characteristic of video or film footage displayed possessing a sufficiently high frame rate (or field rate) that moving images do not blur or strobe even when tracked closely by the eye. The most common forms of high motion are NTSC and PAL video (i.e., "normal television") at their native display rates. Movie film (at the standard 24 frame/s) does not portray high motion even when shown on television monitors.

== History ==
In the early 20th century when 35 mm movie film was developed, producers found that 18–24 frames per second was adequate for portraying motion in a movie theater environment. Flicker was still a problem at these rates, but projectors solved this by projecting each frame twice, thus creating a refresh rate of 36–48 Hz without using excessive amounts of film. However, when television was developed, there was no corresponding way to capture a video frame and project it twice. The solution to this was interlace, which had a side effect that 50 to 60 images per second were presented to the viewer.

Television producers found that these higher image rates made certain shots possible that were unacceptable on film. Camera pans and text scrolls could be faster. Handheld camera work seemed less objectionable, and most importantly, sports action was much clearer — particularly when following a ball was critical.

== Definition of high motion ==
There are no commonly used imaging systems that run at rates higher than 30 frame/s but lower than 48 Hz, so 48 Hz or higher is the de facto standard for high motion. The effects of high motion can be reduced or negated by converter lag when NTSC video is converted to PAL, or vice versa (a particular problem for coverage of international sporting events such as the Olympic Games or the FIFA World Cup, for example); however, more recent motion adaptive converters can minimize this. Showscan's research indicates that an average of 66.7 frames per second is the upper limit of what the human visual system can perceive, and higher frame rates have no further effect, except in reducing flicker. (See Refresh rate.)

== High motion and the "video look" ==
Until the late 1990s, programs shot on video always possessed high motion, while programming shot on film never did. (The exceptions: Certain motion simulators and amusement park rides included film projected at 48–60 frames per second, and video recorded on kinescope film recorders lost its high motion characteristic.) This had the result of high motion being associated with news coverage and low-budget programming such as soap operas and some sitcoms. Higher-budget programming on television was usually shot on film. In the 1950s, when Hollywood experimented with higher frame rates for films (such as with the Todd AO process) some objected to the more video-like look (although the inability to convert such films for projection in regular theaters was a more serious problem).

High motion is often criticized as interfering with the suspension of disbelief, and making it difficult to forget that the viewer is watching actors performing a scene. Some feel that this is an inherent advantage to lower frame rates, while others suggest that it is due to the historical availability of high motion only in programs that are least able to use the medium artistically, and the evolution of acting techniques based on lack of high motion. In areas where high-motion drama is more common, such as Britain, viewers tend to tolerate the look better.

== Effects of new technology ==
In the mid and late 2000s, digital video technology had started to make it possible to shoot video at the "film look" rate of 24 frame/s at little or no additional cost. This had resulted in less high motion on television and on the internet on Video sharing applications such as YouTube in the early to mid 2010s.

The future presence of digital projectors in theaters opens up the possibility that Hollywood movies could someday include high motion—perhaps in action films intercut with 24 frame/s for non-action scenes. The MaxiVision48 3-perf film format promotes this use with its ability to switch from 24 frame/s to 48 frame/s on the fly during projection. However, 3-perf has not seen much adaptation as a projection format.

Director Peter Jackson's three-part Hobbit film series was shot at 48 fps, using the Red Digital Cinema Epic video camera system.

Alongside action cameras, gaming monitors often display very high refresh rates as high as 240 Hz as of 2017, while generally the standard is 144 Hz. This means gaming displays can display videos shot at high motion and play them back at their proper frame rates in real time at up to 240 fps, achieving basically an authentic high motion look. While 120 fps looks "realistic", the stroboscopic look can still be seen, which also happens on 60 Hz monitors playing 60 fps video and sometimes excessive motion blur, depending on the camera and shutter speed that was used when the video was recorded. Otherwise, videos over 200 fps are more preferred, since they look more fluid and realistic naturally or by simply changing the shutter speed with an ND filter at frame rates between 50 fps and 120 fps.

YouTube in October 2014 started to allow high-motion content or high frame rate content, as well as videos before 2014 uploaded at over 30 fps, up to 60 fps.

== Alternate use of the term ==
In the context of digital video compression, "high motion" is sometimes used to describe footage in which frames change too rapidly for motion prediction techniques to be effective. This article describes only the high frame rate definition.

== See also ==
- High frame rate
- Jerkiness
- Temporal resolution
