= Temporal resolution =

Discrete resolution of a measurement with respect to time

Temporal resolution (TR) refers to the discrete resolution of a measurement with respect to time. It is defined as the amount of time needed to revisit and acquire data for the same location.

== Remote sensing ==
When applied to remote sensing, this amount of time is influenced by the sensor platform's orbital characteristics and the features of the sensor itself. The temporal resolution is low when the revisiting delay is high and vice versa. Temporal resolution is typically expressed in days.

== Physics ==
Often there is a trade-off between the temporal resolution of a measurement and its spatial resolution, due to Heisenberg's uncertainty principle. In some contexts, such as particle physics, this trade-off can be attributed to the finite speed of light and the fact that it takes a certain period of time for the photons carrying information to reach the observer. In this time, the system might have undergone changes itself. Thus, the longer the light has to travel, the lower the temporal resolution.

== Technology ==
=== Computing ===
In another context, there is often a tradeoff between temporal resolution and computer storage. A transducer may be able to record data every millisecond, but available storage may not allow this, and in the case of 4D PET imaging the resolution may be limited to several minutes.

=== Electronic displays ===
In some applications, temporal resolution may instead be equated to the sampling period, or its inverse, the refresh rate, or update frequency in Hertz, of a TV, for example.

The temporal resolution is distinct from temporal uncertainty. This would be analogous to conflating image resolution with optical resolution. One is discrete, the other, continuous.

The temporal resolution is a resolution somewhat the 'time' dual to the 'space' resolution of an image. In a similar way, the sample rate is equivalent to the pixel pitch on a display screen, whereas the optical resolution of a display screen is equivalent to temporal uncertainty.

Note that both this form of image space and time resolutions are orthogonal to measurement resolution, even though space and time are also orthogonal to each other. Both an image and an oscilloscope capture can have a signal-to-noise ratio, since both also have measurement resolution.

=== Oscilloscopy ===
An oscilloscope is the temporal equivalent of a microscope, and it is limited by temporal uncertainty the same way a microscope is limited by optical resolution. A digital sampling oscilloscope has also a limitation analogous to image resolution, which is the sample rate. A non-digital non-sampling oscilloscope is still limited by temporal uncertainty.

The temporal uncertainty can be related to the maximum frequency of continuous signal the oscilloscope could respond to, called the bandwidth and given in Hertz. But for oscilloscopes, this figure is not the temporal resolution. To reduce confusion, oscilloscope manufacturers use 'Sa/s' instead of 'Hz' to specify the temporal resolution.

Two cases for oscilloscopes exist: either the probe settling time is much shorter than the real time sampling rate, or it is much larger. The case where the settling time is the same as the sampling time is usually undesirable in an oscilloscope. It is more typical to prefer a larger ratio either way, or if not, to be somewhat longer than two sample periods.

In the case where it is much longer, the most typical case, it dominates the temporal resolution. The shape of the response during the settling time also has as strong effect on the temporal resolution. For this reason probe leads usually offer an arrangement to 'compensate' the leads to alter the trade off between minimal settling time, and minimal overshoot.

If it is much shorter, the oscilloscope may be prone to aliasing from radio frequency interference, but this can be removed by repeatedly sampling a repetitive signal and averaging the results together. If the relationship between the 'trigger' time and the sample clock can be controlled with greater accuracy than the sampling time, then it is possible to make a measurement of a repetitive waveform with much higher temporal resolution than the sample period by upsampling each record before averaging. In this case the temporal uncertainty may be limited by clock jitter.

== See also ==
- High-motion
