= Soap opera effect =

Video side effect where image is hyperreal

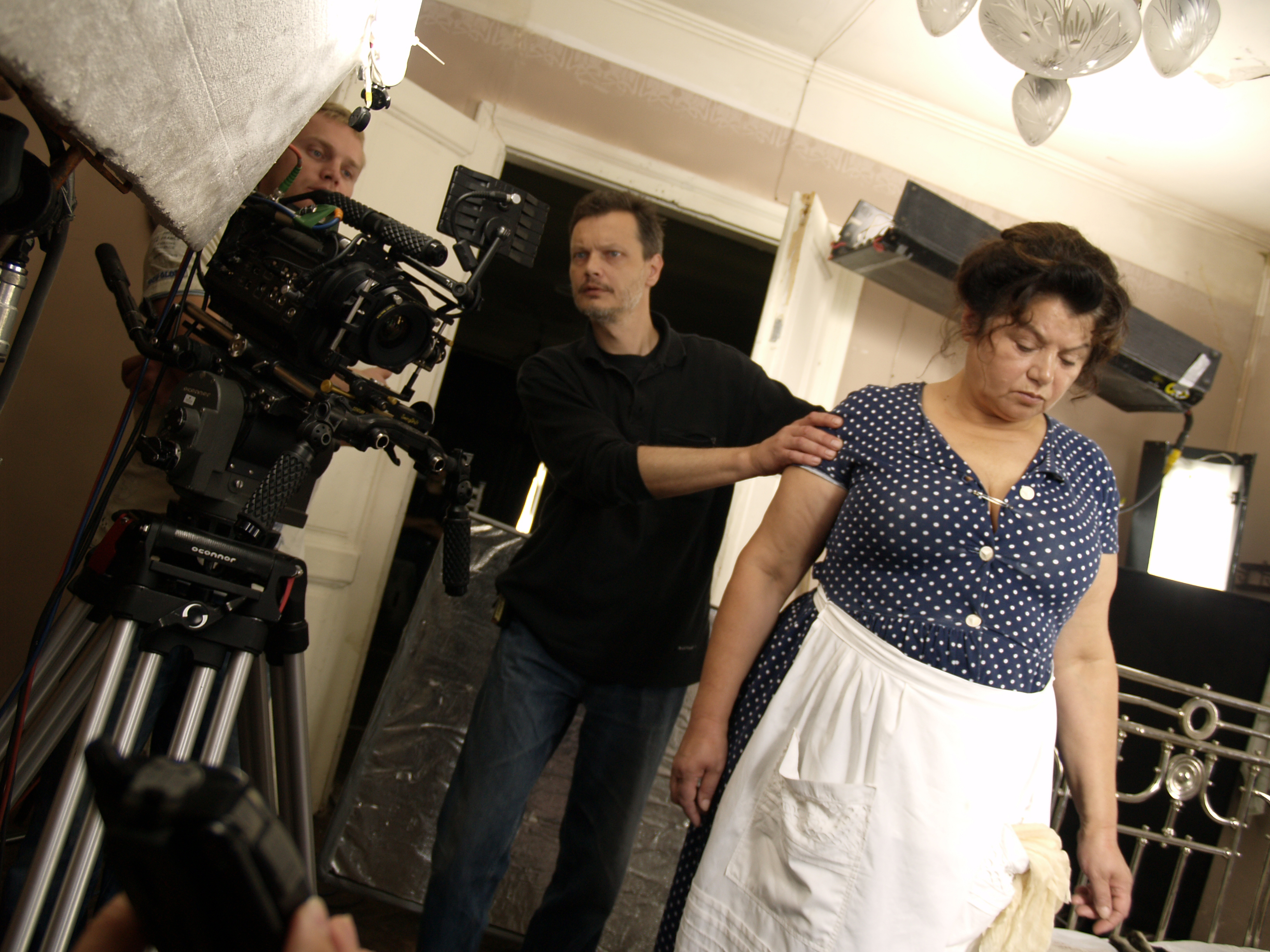
The soap opera effect may make footage seem low-budget or lacking in cinematic style.

The soap opera effect is a complaint against motion pictures with a high frame rate or shot on video as opposed to film stock. Images are denounced as "too realistic" or "too smooth" and therefore undesirable, especially for theatrical films.

These complaints are less common outside of cinema, where some people praise or prefer higher frame rates (such as the increasingly common 50 and 60 FPS or higher), especially for sports, news and video games, due to superior ergonomics and fluidity onscreen.

The opposite effect is the film look, felt by some as desirable enough to imitate through "filmization" or film emulation.

== Background ==
This term is a reference to the distinctive appearance of most broadcast television soap operas or multicam sitcoms, which were typically shot using less expensive 50/60 Hz video rather than pricier 24 FPS film used in theatrical movies or telecined for singlecam TV dramas.

Differences in motion are most obvious in pans and other camera movement, while differences in color correction and other on-set dressing may be imposed by the camera's video sensor characteristics. Different acutance, whether real sharpness from spatial image resolution and motion blur as from shutter angle or induced jaggies and edge enhancement occurring somewhere in the signal chain, also contributes to the distinction expected between traditional theatrical and TV content.

Such effects can be simulated with additional visual artifacts, also in realtime by viewing equipment such as a TV, via various types of video post-processing. These can include motion interpolation (distinct from interpolation between key frames in video game and computer graphics), edge enhancement, video denoising, deblurring, color grading, and 2D to 3D conversion. In some cases, such as that of motion interpolation, this can not only smooth 24 FPS movies to the 60 FPS of TV, but bring both to even higher rates such as 120 FPS.

== Reception ==
=== Negative ===
Mentions of the soap opera effect say it ruins the theatrical look of cinematography due to the strong picture sharpness and high detail visibility of fast-moving imagery, which is usually lacking in theatrical or prime time presentations. Those who complain of it feel as if it makes the picture look artificial and unfamiliar, since they are not accustomed to watching such programs with a frame rate that high.

Some audiences felt disconcerted watching The Hobbit: An Unexpected Journey at 48 frames per second as opposed to the 24 FPS conventional for theaters, where they opined that the film looked "unnatural" and "too real", thereby giving it a "soap opera" look.

Motion interpolation, which was not intended by the filmmakers or captured by the camera, also annoys some filmmakers. In 2018 while Mission: Impossible – Fallout was launching its Blu-ray home release, Tom Cruise and director Christopher McQuarrie released a public service announcement describing the motion effect and how postprocessing induces it; this has received endorsements from industry peers like Rian Johnson. Because methods and terminology differ, the UHD Alliance proposed that all televisions have a "Filmmaker Mode" button on remote controls to disable motion smoothing. Vizio, LG, Samsung, and Panasonic have pledged to do so – Since 2020, LG TVs have 'Filmmaker Mode' integrated in the coding for Amazon Prime Video, so that the motion filter is disabled by default during Prime Video movies and shows.

=== Positive ===
Sports viewers appreciate clear motion enough that early HDTV broadcasters commonly chose 720p60 over 1080i60 specifically for sports. For the same reason, uptake of motion interpolation is most common for sports, as it reduces motion blur produced by camera pans, shaky cameras, rapidly moving objects, or sample and hold, thus potentially yielding better clarity and smoothness of such subjects without the need for as much flicker. It may also be used to increase the displayed framerate of video games, especially on a slower computer, console titles where performance can't be improved, or a TV that can't accept external signals reaching native refresh at native resolution, although additional display lag may be excessive, especially if applied outside the render pipeline.

In the early 2000s, the "video look" was created deliberately by the VidFIRE technique to restore archive television programs that only survive as film telerecordings, such as early seasons of the TV series Doctor Who. VidFIRE made its broadcast debut on BBC2 in 2001 where the effect was applied to a few episodes of Dad's Army. Subsequently, it was used to critical acclaim in the restoration of The Seeds of Death, The Dalek Invasion of Earth and the Lost in Time collection.

== See also ==
- Flicker-free
- Inbetweening
- Motion compensation
- Motion interpolation
