= Black Shark 3 =

Android-based smartphones manufactured by Xiaomi

Black Shark 3 Black Shark 3 Pro Black Shark 3S
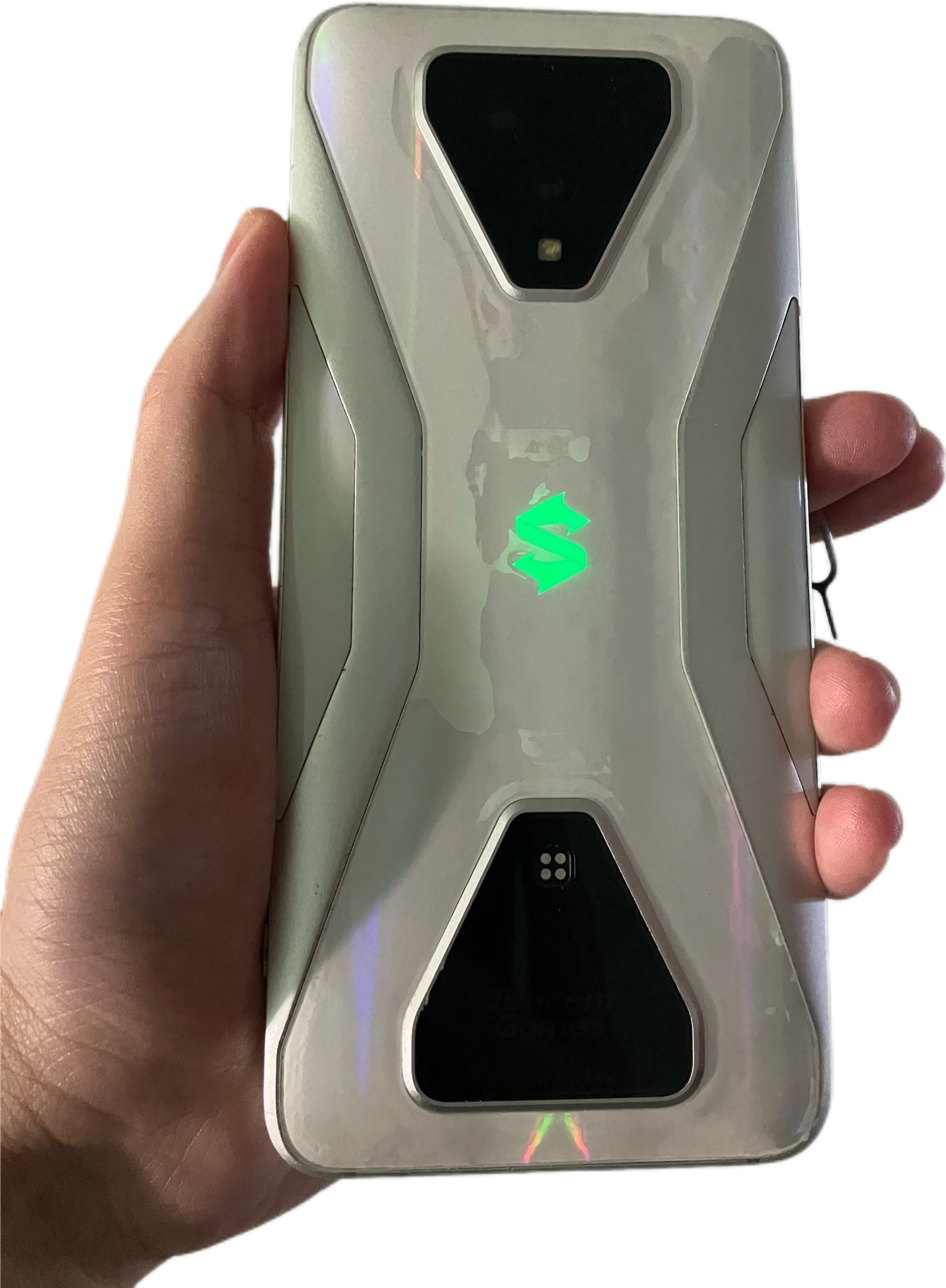
- The back of the Black Shark 3 in Star Silver
- Brand: Black Shark
- Manufacturer: Xiaomi
- Type: Smartphone
- Series: Black Shark
- First released: March 6, 2020; 6 years ago
- Predecessor: Black Shark 2
- Successor: Black Shark 4
- Related: Xiaomi Mi 10
- Compatible networks: GSM / CDMA / HSPA / EVDO / LTE / 5G
- Form factor: Slate
- Dimensions: 3/3S: 168.7 mm (6.64 in) H 77.3 mm (3.04 in) W 10.4 mm (0.41 in) D; 3 Pro: 177.8 mm (7.00 in) H 83.3 mm (3.28 in) W 10.1 mm (0.40 in) D
- Weight: 3/3S: 222 g (7.8 oz); 3 Pro: 253 g (8.9 oz)
- Operating system: Android 10 + Joy UI 12
- System-on-chip: Qualcomm Snapdragon 865 5G (7 nm+)
- CPU: Octa-core (1x2.84 GHz Cortex-A77 & 3x2.42 GHz Cortex-A77 & 4x1.80 GHz Cortex-A55)
- GPU: Adreno 650
- Memory: 8 or 12 GB RAM
- Storage: 3/3S: 128 or 256 GB; 3 Pro: 256 or 512 GB
- SIM: Dual SIM (Nano-SIM, dual stand-by)
- Battery: 3: Li-Po 4720 mAh; 3 Pro: Li-Po 5000 mAh; 3S: Li-Po 4729 mAh
- Charging: Fast charging 65W; Fast charging 30W (128/8 model); Magnetic charging 18W
- Rear camera: 64 MP, f/1.8, 26mm (wide), 1/1.72", 0.8μm, PDAF; 13 MP, f/2.3, (ultrawide); 5 MP, f/2.2, (depth); LED flash, HDR, panorama; 4K@30/60fps, 1080p@30/60/240fps, 720p@1920fps
- Front camera: 20 MP, f/2.2, (wide), 1/3", 0.9μm 1080p@30fps
- Display: 3: 6.67 in (169 mm) 1080 × 2400 px resolution, 20:9 aspect ratio (~395 ppi density) AMOLED, 90Hz refresh rate, HDR10+, 500 nits (typ); 3 Pro: 7.1 in (180 mm) 1440 × 3120 px resolution, 19.5:9 aspect ratio (~484 ppi density) AMOLED, 90Hz refresh rate, HDR10+, 500 nits (typ); 3S: 6.67 in (169 mm) 1080 × 2400 px resolution, 20:9 aspect ratio (~395 ppi density) AMOLED, 120Hz refresh rate, HDR10+, 500 nits (typ)
- External display: Always On
- Sound: Stereo speakers
- Connectivity: Wi-Fi 802.11 a/b/g/n/ac/6, dual-band, Wi-Fi Direct, hotspot Bluetooth 5.0, A2DP, LE, aptX HD, aptX Adaptive
- Data inputs: Fingerprint scanner; Accelerometer; Gyroscope; Proximity sensor; Compass

Black Shark 3 or Black Shark Pro are line of Android-based gaming smartphones developed and manufactured by Xiaomi as part of its Black Shark product line. It is the successor to the Black Shark 2 line and was launched on March 03, 2020.
