= Black Shark 4 =

Android-based smartphones manufactured by Xiaomi

Black Shark 4 Black Shark 4 Pro Black Shark 4S Black Shark 4S Pro
- Brand: Black Shark
- Manufacturer: Xiaomi
- Type: Smartphone
- Series: Black Shark
- First released: March 30, 2021; 5 years ago
- Predecessor: Black Shark 3
- Successor: Black Shark 5
- Compatible networks: 2G, 3G, 4G, 4G LTE and 5G
- Form factor: Slate
- Dimensions: Black Shark 4/4 Pro: 163.8 mm (6.45 in) H 76.4 mm (3.01 in) W 9.9 mm (0.39 in) D; Black Shark 4S/4S Pro: 163.7 mm (6.44 in) H 76.2 mm (3.00 in) W 9.9 mm (0.39 in) D
- Weight: Black Shark 4/4S: 210 g (7.4 oz); Black Shark 4 Pro/4S Pro: 220 g (7.8 oz)
- Operating system: Android 11 with Joy UI 12.5
- System-on-chip: Black Shark 4/4S: Qualcomm Snapdragon 870 5G; Black Shark 4 Pro: Qualcomm Snapdragon 888 5G (5 nm); Black Shark 4S Pro: Qualcomm Snapdragon 888+ 5G (5 nm)
- CPU: Black Shark 4/4S: Octa-core (1x3.2 GHz Kryo 585 & 3x2.42 GHz Kryo 585 & 4x1.80 GHz Kryo 585); Black Shark 4 Pro: Octa-core (1x2.84 GHz Kryo 680 & 3x2.42 GHz Kryo 680 & 4x1.80 GHz Kryo 680); Black Shark 4S Pro: Octa-core (1x3.0 GHz Kryo 680 & 3x2.42 GHz Kryo 680 & 4x1.80 GHz Kryo 680
- GPU: Black Shark 4/4S: Adreno 650; Black Shark 4 Pro/4S Pro: Adreno 660
- Memory: 6 GB/8 GB/12 GB (Base); 8 GB/12 GB/16 GB (Pro)
- Storage: UFS 3.1; 128/256 GB (Base); 128/256/512 GB (Pro)
- Removable storage: None
- SIM: Dual SIM (Nano-SIM, dual stand-by)
- Battery: Li-Po 4500 mAh
- Charging: 120W Hyper Charge
- Rear camera: Black Shark 4/4S: 48 MP, f/1.8, (wide), 1/2.0", 0.8μm, PDAF 8 MP, f/2.2, 120˚ (ultrawide), 1/4.0", 1.12μm 5 MP, f/2.4, (macro), AF; Black Shark 4 Pro/4S Pro: 64 MP, f/1.8, (wide), 1/1.97", 0.7μm, PDAF 8 MP, f/2.2, 120˚ (ultrawide), 1/4.0", 1.12μm 5 MP, f/2.4, (macro), AF; All: LED flash, HDR, panorama 4K@30/60fps, 1080p@30/60/240fps, 1080p@960fps
- Front camera: 20 MP, f/2.0, (wide), 0.8μm 1080p@30fps
- Display: 6.67 in (169 mm); 1080 x 2400 resolution, 20:9 ratio (~395 ppi density); Super AMOLED, 144Hz refresh rate, HDR10+, 1300 nits (peak)
- External display: Always on
- Connectivity: Wi-Fi 802.11 a/b/g/n/ac/6, dual-band, Wi-Fi Direct, hotspot Bluetooth 5.2, A2DP, LE, aptX HD, aptX Adaptive
- Website: Base: https://global.blackshark.com/pages/blackshark4 Pro: https://global.blackshark.com/pages/blackshark4pro

The Xiaomi Black Shark 4 is a line of Android-based gaming smartphones developed and manufactured by Xiaomi as part of its Black Shark product line. It is the successor to the Black Shark 3 line and was launched on March 23, 2021.
