= Display motion blur =

Blurriness due to image persistence when tracking objects

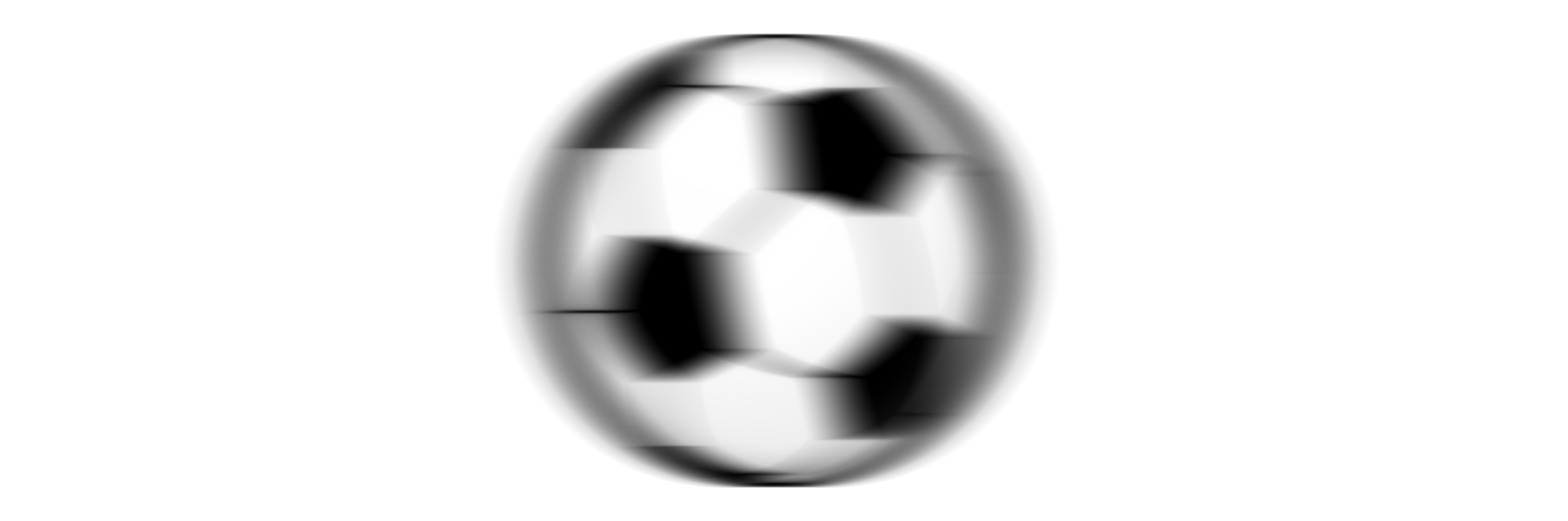
Depiction of eye-tracking motion blur

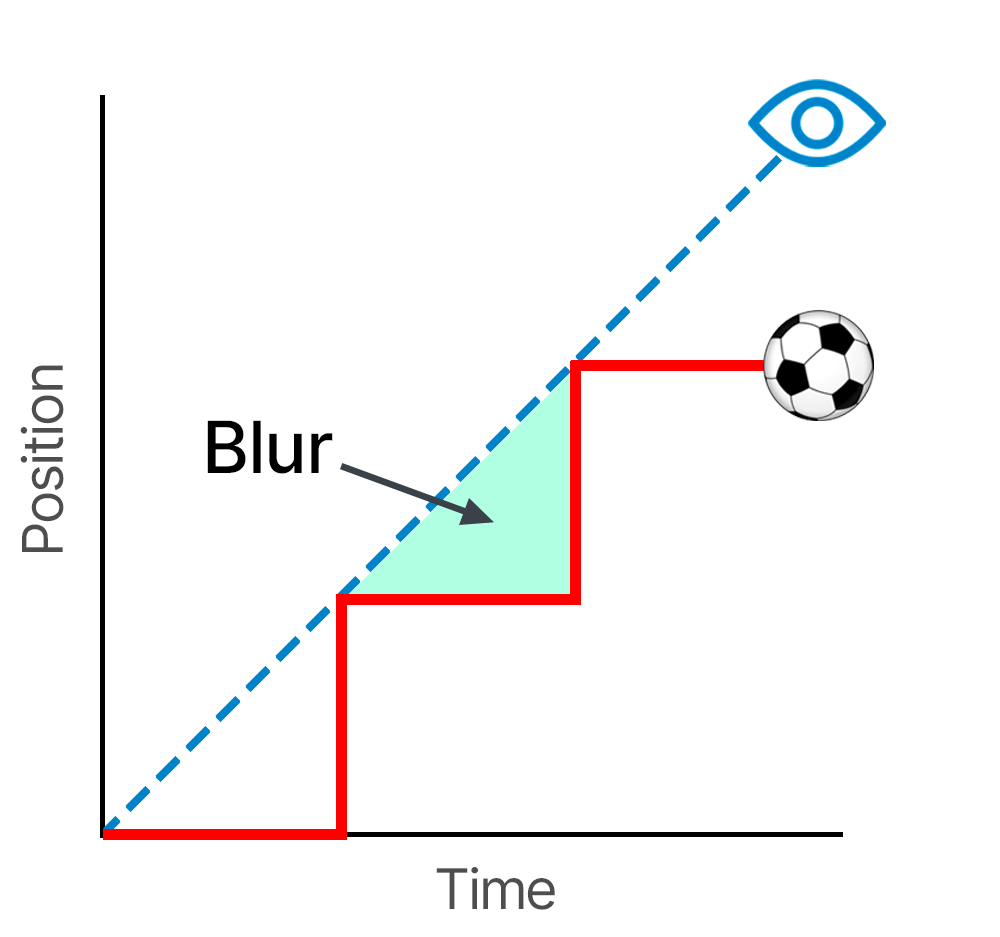
Discrepancy in eye tracking on common sample-and-hold type displays.

In modern displays, motion blur is an unwanted artifact caused primarily by:

1. Retinal blur resulting from the person's eyes continuously tracking discrete movement. While the eyes move, the object one is tracking remains stationary throughout each frame, causing it to "smear". This does not happen in real life where both move continuously.
2. Slow pixel response times, which lead to visible ghosting or smearing.

The faster the motion, the more pronounced the effect is.

== Cause ==
Displays work by rapidly showing frames, each one slightly different from the previous, thereby creating the illusion of movement. An example being a normal computer monitor with a resolution of 1920×1080 and a refresh rate of 60 Hz. If an object were to move across the display in 2 seconds, there would be 60×2 = 120 "steps", each one translated by 1920÷120 = 16 pixels. The person's eyes, however, would not start and stop, over and over again to track the object, quickly moving the fovea to the "new" position of the object for 1000÷60 ≈ 16 milliseconds, only to do it again and again. Instead, the person's gaze would move across the display in a fluid motion, following the approximate location of said object. Because the eyes rotate to track something that doesn't actually move in a smooth, continuous motion, the image gets "smeared" across the retina. This mismatch is what causes motion blur, and explains why it doesn't occur when tracking physical objects; unlike the simulated motion on displays, real motion is actually continuous, whereas on a display, objects travel in a discrete steps. The experienced motion blur can be approximated purely as a function of persistence, similar to the shutter speed when taking pictures, because motion wise, it is actually the same thing, just from opposite frames of reference.

== Reducing motion blur ==
Motion clarity can be improved by decreasing the persistence, which is the amount of time the image is displayed for. Manufacturers use various names for their motion clarity enhancing technologies. Nvidia's implementation is called Ultra Low Motion Blur (ULMB), Asus' Extreme Low Motion Blur (ELMB), and BenQ Zowie uses DyAc and DyAc+ (Dynamic Accuracy). LG refers to black frame insertion (BFI) on their OLED TV's as "OLED Motion (Pro)". The "pro" monitor denotes that BFI at 120 Hz is supported, as opposed to being limited to 60.

=== Black frame insertion ===
The key to reducing motion blur lies in decreasing the time the pixels stay illuminated. On liquid-crystal displays, this can be accomplished by strobing the backlight, whereas on OLEDs, this must be done by rapidly turning the pixels on and off, made possible by the fact that OLEDs have response times far shorter than those of LCDs. OLED TVs released 2020 & 2021 utilizing LG's WOLED panels feature black frame insertion at 120 Hz, with a duty cycle as low as 38%, resulting in a mere 3.2 ms of persistence. Due to the BFI, the experienced motion blur is comparable to that of a regular sample-and-hold OLED display running at roughly 310 Hz.

=== Backlight strobing ===
By quickly turning the backlight on and off ("strobing"), the image appears for a shorter amount of time. This reduction in persistence is what reduces motion blur. Different manufacturers use many names for their strobed backlight technologies for reducing motion blur on sample-and-hold LCDs.

=== Motion interpolation ===
Some displays use motion interpolation to run at a higher refresh rate, such as 100 Hz or 120 Hz to reduce motion blur. Motion interpolation generates artificial in-between frames that are inserted between the real frames. The advantage is reduced motion blur on sample-and-hold displays such as LCD.

There can be side-effects, including the soap opera effect if interpolation is enabled while watching movies (24 fps material). Motion interpolation also adds input lag, which makes it undesirable for interactive activity such as computers and video games.

Recently, 240 Hz interpolation has become available, along with displays that claim an equivalence to 480 Hz or 960 Hz. Some manufacturers use a different terminology such as Samsung's "Clear Motion Rate 960" instead of "Hz". This avoids incorrect usage of the "Hz" terminology, due to multiple motion blur reduction technologies in use, including both motion interpolation and strobed backlights.

Manufacturer Terminology:

- JVC uses "Clear Motion Drive".
- LG uses "TruMotion".
- Samsung uses "Auto Motion Plus" (AMP), "Clear Motion Rate" (CMR), and "Motion Rate".
- Sony uses "Motionflow".
- Toshiba uses "Clear Frame".
- Sharp uses "AquoMotion".
- Vizio uses "Clear Action".

=== Laser TV ===
Laser TV has the potential to eliminate double imaging and motion artifacts by utilizing a scanning architecture similar to the way that a CRT works. Laser TV is generally not yet available from many manufacturers. Claims have been made on television broadcasts such as KRON 4 News' Coverage of Laser TV from October 2006, but no consumer-grade laser television sets have made any significant improvements in reducing any form of motion artifacts since that time. One recent development in laser display technology has been the phosphor-excited laser, as demonstrated by Prysm's newest displays. These displays currently scan at 240 Hz, but are currently limited to a 60 Hz input. This has the effect of presenting four distinct images when eye tracking a fast-moving object seen from a 60 Hz input source.

There has also been Microvision's Laser MEMS Based Pico Projector Pro, which has no display lag, no input lag and no persistence or motion blur.

== See also ==
- Interlaced video
- Telecine judder
- Soap opera effect
