= Cleanup (animation) =

Stage of animation workflow

Clean-up is a part of the workflow in the production of hand-drawn animation, in which assistant animators create the final drawings seen in the finished film.

== History ==
In 1929, Walt Disney promoted Wilfred Jackson as an animator. At the time, Jackson did not have an assistant, therefore he drew his own inbetweens whenever necessary. As Walt Disney Productions hired more animators, the use of inbetweening became prevalent in order to increase the animators' output. By 1931, a three-tier system—the animator, assistant animator, and an inbetweener—developed within the studio. William Garity, Disney's technical director, described the hierarchy in a 1932 letter stating each Disney animator had "an 'inbetween' man or an assistant, and generally too apprentices."

In 1932, Disney ordered his animators to start making their animation drawings as rough sketches, rather than finished drawings, and to shoot pencil tests of their rough animation. According to Jackson, Disney made the decision after reviewing Norm Ferguson's very rough animation in pencil test, which were legible despite the sketchiness of the drawings. Within a year, Disney animators implemented the new policy, in which they drew rough sketches and made pencil tests of their animation. Once the pencil tests were approved, assistant animators were assigned to do "key clean-ups", which were drawings that defined how the scene would appear.

== Process ==
In traditional animation, the first drawings are called "roughs" or "rough animation" because they are often done in a very loose fashion. The occupational gesture for the animator is to flip the drawings in constant sequence to get a visual impression of how the action would appear on screen. When the animator finishes their drawings, they are handed to an inbetweener, who creates more rough drawings within the key poses to complete the action. Next, the rough animation needs to be approved by the director and/or production supervisor in sweat box. When it has been approved, the rough animation is sent to "clean-up", where the assistant animator polishes the rough sketches so they are ready to be traced in ink onto cels.

In contemporary 2D animation production, the clean-up drawings are scanned (or done digitally through a graphics tablet and software) and then reviewed by the lead clean-up artist. When the shots are completed, it is reviewed by the director(s) for evaluation during a clean-up animation dailies session. Once it has been approved by the director(s), the shots are passed along to the animation effects department or, if no effects shots are required, to animation check.

Generally, the clean-up artists will follow the intentions of the animators and stay true to performance and movement. Clean-up is generally done on a new sheet of paper. They can be done on the same sheet as the rough animation, with a blue pencil as they will be invisible to photocopying machines, and can be filtered out by scanners.

== Sources ==
- Barrier, Michael (1999). Hollywood Cartoons: American Animation in Its Golden Age. Oxford University Press. ISBN 978-0-1980-2079-0.
- Barrier, Michael (2007). The Animated Man: A Life of Walt Disney. University of California Press. ISBN 978-0-5202-5619-4.
- Culhane, Shamus (1988). Animation From Script to Screen. New York: St. Martin's Press. ISBN 0-312-05052-6.
- Thomas, Bob (1958). Walt Disney, the Art of Animation. Simon & Schuster.
- Winder, Catherine; Dowlatabadi, Zahra (2001). Producing Animation. Amsterdam: Focal Press. ISBN 978-1-136-13261-2.
