= Black Shark 5 =

Android-based smartphones manufactured by Xiaomi

Black Shark 5 Black Shark 5 Pro Black Shark 5 RS
- Brand: Black Shark
- Manufacturer: Xiaomi
- Type: Smartphone
- Series: Black Shark
- First released: March 30, 2022; 4 years ago
- Availability by region: April 4, 2022
- Predecessor: Black Shark 4
- Successor: Black Shark 6 (cancelled)
- Compatible networks: 2G / 3G / 4G LTE / 5G NR
- Form factor: Slate
- Dimensions: Black Shark 5: 163.8 mm (6.45 in) H 76.3 mm (3.00 in) W 10 mm (0.39 in) D; Black Shark 5 Pro: 163.9 mm (6.45 in) H 76.5 mm (3.01 in) W 9.5 mm (0.37 in) D; Black Shark 5 RS: 163.7 mm (6.44 in) H 76.2 mm (3.00 in) W 9.9 mm (0.39 in) D
- Weight: Black Shark 5: 218 g (7.7 oz); Black Shark 5 Pro/RS: 220 g (7.8 oz)
- Operating system: Android 12 with Joy UI 13
- System-on-chip: Black Shark 5: Snapdragon 870 5G (7 nm); Black Shark 5 Pro: Snapdragon 8 Gen 1 (4 nm); Black Shark 5 RS: Snapdragon 888/888+ 5G (5 nm)
- CPU: Black Shark 5: Octa-core (1x3.2 GHz Kryo 585 & 3x2.42 GHz Kryo 585 & 4x1.80 GHz Kryo 585); Black Shark 5 Pro: Octa-core (1x3.00 GHz Cortex-X2 & 3x2.40 GHz Cortex-A710 & 4x1.70 GHz Cortex-A510); Black Shark 5 RS: Octa-core (1x2.84/3.0 GHz Kryo 680 & 3x2.42 GHz Kryo 680 & 4x1.80 GHz Kryo 680)
- GPU: Black Shark 5: Adreno 650; Black Shark 5 Pro: Adreno 730; Black Shark 5 RS: Adreno 660
- Memory: 5 and 5 RS: 8 GB or 12 GB RAM; 5 Pro: 8 GB, 12 GB or 16 GB RAM
- Storage: Black Shark 5: 128 or 256 GB; Black Shark 5 Pro: 256 or 512 GB; Black Shark 5 RS: 256 GB
- SIM: Dual SIM (Nano-SIM, dual stand-by)
- Battery: Black Shark 5/5 Pro: 4650 mAh; Black Shark 5 RS: 4500 mAh
- Charging: Fast charging 120W
- Rear camera: Black Shark 5: 64 MP, f/1.8, (wide), PDAF 13 MP, f/2.4, 120˚ (ultrawide) 2 MP, f/2.4, (macro); Black Shark 5 Pro: 108 MP, f/1.8, (wide), 1/1.52", 0.7µm, PDAF 13 MP, f/2.4, 120˚ (ultrawide) 5 MP, f/2.4, (telephoto macro), AF; Black Shark 5 RS: 64 MP, f/1.8, (wide), 1/1.97", 0.7µm, PDAF 8 MP, 120˚ (ultrawide) 5 MP, f/2.4, (telephoto macro); All: LED flash, HDR, panorama 4K@30/60fps, 1080p@30/60/240fps, 1080p@960fps
- Front camera: Black Shark 5/5 Pro: 16 MP, (wide); Black Shark 5 RS: 20 MP, (wide) 1080p@30fps
- Display: 6.67 in (169 mm); 1080 x 2400 resolution, 20:9 aspect ratio (~395 ppi density); AMOLED, 144Hz refresh rate, 1300 nits (peak)
- External display: Always on
- Sound: Stereo speakers 24-bit/192kHz audio
- Connectivity: Wi-Fi 802.11 a/b/g/n/ac/6, dual-band, Wi-Fi Direct, hotspot Bluetooth 5.2, A2DP, LE, aptX HD, aptX Adaptive; A-GPS, GLONASS, GALILEO, QZSS, BDS
- Data inputs: Multi-touch screen; USB Type-C 2.0; Fingerprint scanner (side-mounted); Accelerometer; Gyroscope; Proximity sensor; Compass; Barometer

The Black Shark 5, Black Shark 5 Pro and Black Shark 5 RS are Android-based gaming smartphones designed and manufactured by Xiaomi, announced on 30 March 2022.

After initially launching in China, the Black Shark 5 was released globally on June 9, 2022.
