= Jerkiness =

Perception of all frames while watching a film

Jerkiness (sometimes called strobing or choppy footage) describes the perception of individual still images while watching a motion picture.

== Description ==
Motion pictures are made from still images shown in rapid sequence. Provided there is sufficient continuity between the images and provided the sequence is shown fast enough, the central nervous system interprets the sequence as continuous motion. However, some technologies cannot process or carry data fast enough for sufficiently high frame rates. For example, viewing motion pictures by Internet connection generally necessitates a greatly reduced frame rate, making jerkiness clearly apparent.

In conventional cinematography, the images are filmed and displayed at 24 frames per second, at which speed jerkiness is not normally discernible. Television screens refresh at even higher frequencies. PAL and SÉCAM television (the standards in Europe) refresh at 25 or 50 (HDTV) frames per second. NTSC television displays (the standard in North America) refresh at 29.97 frames per second. Animated cartoon films are typically made at reduced frame rates (accomplished by shooting several film frames of the individual drawings) so as to limit production costs, with the result that jerkiness tends to be apparent, especially on older limited animation features.

== Other uses ==
Strobing can also refer to cross colour and Moiré patterning. Cross colour refers to when any high frequency luminance content of the picture, close to the TV system's colour sub-carrier frequency, is interpreted by the analogue receiver's decoder as colour information. Moiré patterning is where an interference pattern is produced by fine scene detail beating with the line (or even pixel) structure of the device used to analyse or display the scene.

== See also ==
- Persistence of vision
