= Sweat box =

Animation terminology

"Sweat box" is the animation industry's equivalent to rushes, or dailies. Nowadays, when an animated scene has been approved by the animation lead, it is sent to the edit suite. The editor inserts the scene into the relevant animatic or Leica reel for viewing in context with other scenes. The director views the reel and calls for changes or approves the scenes.

As it is important for the entire crew to be up to date on changes or approvals made by the director (since significant changes may have cascading effects throughout the rest of the film or show), a sweat box session will typically be attended by producers, production staff and department supervisors. Quite often the animator responsible for a scene may be called into the meeting to take specific instructions ("notes" in industry jargon) from the director on the changes to be made.

== Etymology ==
In the 2001 book Producing Animation, Catherine Winder and Zahra Dowlatabadi explain:

The origin for the term "sweat box" is said to date back to when Walt Disney would view the scenes completed through rough animation with his animators and critique their work. Some attribute the word "sweat" to the fact that screenings took place in a small theater and it got hot, while others believe that the animators would actually sweat in response to how Disney might react to their work. Either way, the same wording is used today when a scene is ready to be approved by the director in stages of rough animation, clean up and effects animation, and final color.
