= Frame rate control =

Color improvement in liquid-crystal displays

Green and cyan-green mixed statically (top) and by rapidly alternating (bottom)

Frame rate control (FRC) or temporal dithering is a method for achieving greater color depth particularly in liquid-crystal displays.

Older, cheaper, or faster LCDs, especially those using TN, often represent colors using only 6 bits per RGB color, or 18 bit in total, and are unable to display the 16.78 million color shades (24-bit truecolor) that contemporary signal sources like graphics cards, video game consoles, set-top boxes, and video cameras can output. Instead, they use a temporal dithering method that combines successive colors in the same pixel to simulate the desired shade. This is distinct from, though can be combined with, spatial dithering, which uses nearby pixels at the same time.

FRC cycles between different color shades within each new frame to simulate an intermediate shade. This can create a potentially noticeable 30 Hz (half frame rate) flicker. Temporal dithering tends to be most noticeable in darker tones, while spatial dithering appears to make the individual pixels of the LCD visible. TFT panels available in 2020 often use FRC to display 30-bit deep color or HDR10 with 24-bit color panels. Temporal dithering is also implemented in software, for if the display itself does not, as for instance GPU drivers from both AMD and Nvidia provide the option, enabled by default on some platforms.

This method is similar in principle to field-sequential color system by CBS and other sequential methods, such as used for grays in DLP, and also colors in single-chip DLP.

In the demonstration video green and cyan-green are mixed both statically (for reference) and by rapidly alternating. A display with a refresh rate of at least 60hz is recommended for this video. Pausing the video shows that the perceived color of the bottom-right square during playback is different from the color seen in any individual frame. In an LCD that uses FRC the colors that are alternated between would be more similar than those in the demonstration video, further reducing the flicker effect.

== See also ==
- Computer monitor
- LCD television
- GigaScreen / DithVIDE / BZither
