= Inbetweening =

Animation technique that creates intermediate frames

Inbetweening, also known as tweening, is a process in animation that involves creating intermediate frames, called inbetweens, between two keyframes. The intended result is to create the illusion of movement by smoothly transitioning one image into another.

== Traditional animation ==
Traditional inbetweening involves the use of a light table to draw a set of pencil and paper drawings.

The process of inbetweening in traditional animation starts with a primary artist, who draws key frames to define movement. After the testing and approval of a rough animation, the scene is passed down to assistants, who perform clean-up and add necessary inbetweening. In large studios, assistants usually add breakdowns, which define the movement in more detail. The scene is then passed down to another assistant, the inbetweener, who completes the animation. In small animation teams, animators will often carry out the full inbetweening process themselves.

Dick Huemer developed this system in the 1920s, and it has become widely used due to its efficiency. Art Davis is said to be the first Inbetweener.

== Frame frequency ==
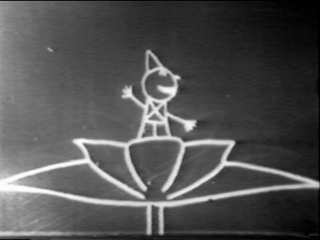
Animation "on twos" has been used for over 100 years, being used for instance in Fantasmagorie (1908).

Typically, the key animator does not make drawings for all 24 frames required for one second of film length. In large studios, a specialized inbetweener artist fills in the gaps between the key drawings. Only very fast movements require 24 drawings per second, which is referred to as animating "on ones". Most movements can be done with 12 drawings per second—called animating "on twos", drawing one out of every two frames. When the number of in-betweens is too few, such as four drawings per second, an animation may begin to lose the illusion of the movement altogether. Computer-generated animation is usually animated "on ones". Frame frequency often varies depending on animation style and is an artistic choice. Animation "on twos" has been used for over 100 years; Fantasmagorie (1908), widely considered the first fully animated movie, was animated on twos.

Modern animation uses various techniques to adapt frame rates. Slow movements may be animated on threes or fours. Different components of a shot might be animated at different frame rates—for example, a character in a panning shot might be animated "on twos", while everything in the shot is shifted every frame ("on ones") to accomplish a panning effect. Optical effects such as motion blur may be used to simulate the appearance of a higher frame rate.

== Digital animation ==
This animated GIF demonstrates the effects of Adobe Flash shape, motion, and colour tweening.

When animating in a digital context, the shortened term tweening is commonly used, and the resulting sequence of frames is called a tween. Sophisticated animation software enables the animator to specify objects in an image and to define how they should move and change during the tweening process. The software may be used to manually render or adjust transitional frames by hand or may be used to automatically render transitional frames using interpolation of graphic parameters.

Some of the earliest software that utilises automatic interpolation in the realm of digital animation includes Adobe Flash and Animo (developed by Cambridge Animation Systems) in the late 90s, and Tweenmaker, released around 2006. The free software program Synfig specializes in automated tweening.

"Ease-in" and "ease-out" in digital animation typically refer to a mechanism for defining the physics of the transition between two animation states, i.e., the linearity of a tween. For example, an ease-in transition would start the animation out slowly, and then progressively get faster as the animation continues. An ease-out transition does the opposite, where the animation starts out quickly but then slows down.

The use of computers for inbetweening was enhanced by Nestor Burtnyk and Marceli Wein at the National Research Council of Canada. They received a Technical Achievement Academy Award in 1997, for "pioneering work in the development of software techniques for computer-assisted keyframing for character animation".

== See also ==
- Flicker fusion threshold
- Morphing
- Onion skinning
- Motion blur
- Smear frames
- Synfig, a free and open-source software (FOSS) tweener
- Soap opera effect
