= High frame rate =

Higher frame rates than typical prior practice

In motion picture technology—either film or video—high frame rate (HFR) refers to higher frame rates than typical prior practice.

The frame rate for motion picture film cameras was typically 24 frames per second (FPS) with multiple flashes on each frame during projection to prevent flicker. Analog television and video employed interlacing where only half of the image (known as a video field) was recorded and played back/refreshed at once but at twice the rate of what would be allowed for progressive video of the same bandwidth, resulting in smoother playback, as opposed to progressive video which is more similar to how celluloid works. Usage of frame rates higher than 24 fps for feature motion pictures and higher than 30 fps for other applications are emerging trends. Filmmakers may capture their projects in a high frame rate so that it can be evenly converted to multiple lower rates for distribution.

== History of frame rates in theaters ==
In early theater history, there was no standard frame rate established. Thomas Edison's early films were shot at 46 fps, while the Lumière Brothers used 16 fps. This had to do with a combination of the use of a hand crank rather than a motor, which created variable frame rates because of the inconsistency of the cranking of the film through the camera. After the introduction of synch sound recording, 24 fps became the industry standard frame rate for capture and projection of motion pictures. 24 fps was chosen because it was the minimum frame rate that would produce adequate sound quality. This was done because film was expensive, and using the lowest possible frame rate would use the least amount of film.

A few film formats have experimented with frame rates higher than the standard 24 fps. The original 3-strip Cinerama features of the 1950s ran at 26 fps. The first two Todd-AO 70 mm features, Oklahoma! (1955) and Around the World in 80 Days (1956) were shot and projected at 30 fps. Douglas Trumbull's 70 mm Showscan film format operated at 60 fps.

The IMAX HD film Momentum, presented at Seville Expo '92, was shot and projected at 48 fps. IMAX HD has also been used in film-based theme park attractions, including Disney's Soarin' Over California.

The proposed Maxivision 48 format ran 35 mm film at 48 fps, but was never commercially deployed.

Digital Cinema Initiatives has published a document outlining recommended practice for high frame rate digital cinema. This document outlines the frame rates and resolutions that can be used in high frame rate digital theatrical presentations with currently available equipment.

In the case of cinema shot on film, as opposed to (whether analog or digital) video, HFR offers an additional benefit beyond temporal smoothness and motion blur. Especially for stationary subject matter, when shot with sufficiently fast stock, the physically random repositioning of film grains in each frame at higher rates effectively oversamples the image's spatial resolution beyond the minimum fineness of individual grains when viewed.

== Usage in the film industry in theaters ==
Peter Jackson's The Hobbit film series, beginning with The Hobbit: An Unexpected Journey in December 2012, used a filming and projection frame rate of 48 frames per second, becoming the first feature film with a wide release to do so. Its 2013 sequel, The Hobbit: The Desolation of Smaug and 2014 sequel, The Hobbit: The Battle of the Five Armies, followed suit. All films also have versions which are converted and projected at 24 fps.

In 2016, Ang Lee released Billy Lynn's Long Halftime Walk. Unlike The Hobbit trilogy, which used 48 frames per second, the picture filmed and projected selected scenes in 120 frames per second, which is five times faster than the 24 frames per second standard used in Hollywood. Lee's 2019 Gemini Man was also shot and distributed in 120 frames per second.

Other filmmakers who intend to use the high frame rate format include James Cameron in his Avatar sequels and Andy Serkis in his adaptation of George Orwell's Animal Farm.

In early 2022, Cameron announced that HFR conversions for his previous films, Avatar and Titanic, were in the works.

Avatar: The Way of Water released on December 16, 2022 with a dynamic frame rate. Select scenes are displayed up to 48 fps, while others are displayed in a more traditional, slower rate.

== Out of the theater ==
Even when shot on film, frame rates higher than 24 fps and 30 fps are quite common in TV drama and in-game cinematics. Approximately 50 or 60 frames per second have been the standard in television and video equipment, broadcast, and storage standards since their inception. Support for native 120 fps content is a primary feature of new Ultra-high-definition television standards such as ATSC 3.0.

Some media players are capable of showing arbitrarily high framerates and almost all computers and smart devices can handle such formats as well. In recent years some televisions can take normal 24 fps videos and "upconvert" them to HFR content by interpolating the motion of the picture, creating new computer-generated frames between each two key frames and running them at higher refresh rate. Similar computer programs allow for that as well but with higher precision and better quality as the computing power of the PC has grown, either real-time or offline.

Filmmakers may originate their projects at 120, 240 or 300 fps so that it may be evenly pulled down to various multiple differing frame rates for distribution, such as 25, 30, 50, and 60 fps for video and 24, 48 or 60 fps for cinematic theater. The same is also done when creating slow motion sequences and is sometimes referred to as "overcranking."

== Video file recording methods ==
Usually, cameras (including those in mobile phones) historically had two ways of encoding high framerate (or slow motion) video into the video file: the real-time method and the menial method.

== See also ==
- High-motion
- Motion interpolation
- Variable refresh rate
- Soap opera effect
