= List of 2D animation software =

This is a list of two-dimensional animation software.

Name	Latest stable release	Developer	License	Operating system or environment
Blender	March 17, 2026	Blender Foundation	GPL-2.0-or-later	Windows, OS X, Linux, FreeBSD
Adobe Character Animator	January 21, 2026	Adobe Systems	Trialware	Windows, OS X
Motion	April 9, 2026	Apple Inc.	Commercial proprietary software	OS X
TupiTube	August 15, 2020	Maefloresta	GPL-2.0-or-later	Windows, OS X, Linux, other Unix-like
Synfig	January 18, 2026	Robert Quattlebaum	GPL-2.0-or-later	Windows, OS X, Linux
Pencil2D	February 25, 2026	Pencil2D Team	GPL-2.0-only	Windows, OS X, Linux, FreeBSD
Harmony	March 25, 2026	Toon Boom Animation Inc.	Commercial Proprietary software Trialware	Windows, Mac OS X, Linux
CrazyTalk	May 22, 2019	Reallusion, Inc	Trialware	Windows, OS X
Krita	March 31, 2026	Krita Foundation, KDE	GPL-3.0-only	Windows, OS X, Linux, FreeBSD, Android
Adobe Animate	October 10, 2023	Adobe Systems	Trialware	Windows, OS X
Live2D	July 30, 2024	Live2D Ltd.	Trialware	Windows, OS X
Clip Studio Paint	January 6, 2026	Celsys	Trialware	Windows, macOS, Android, iPadOS, iOS
Adobe After Effects	January 23, 2026	Adobe Systems	Trialware	Windows, Mac OS X
OpenToonz	May 9, 2023	Dwango	BSD-3-Clause	Windows, OS X, Linux
Pivot Animator	May 13, 2025	Peter Bone	Freeware	Windows
Moho (Anime Studio)	September 12, 2023	Lost Marble LLC	Commercial Proprietary software Trialware	Windows, Mac OS X
DigiCel FlipBook	December 21, 2016	DigiCel Inc.	Trialware	Windows, OS X
Apple iAd Producer	April 1, 2016	Apple Inc.	Registerware	OS X
Toonz	April 12, 2021	Digital Video S.p.a.	Commercial proprietary software	Windows, OS X, Mac OS
TVPaint Animation	December 22, 2022	TVPaint Developpement	Commercial proprietary software	Windows, Mac OS X, Linux, Android
DrawPlus	March 23, 2015	Serif	Commercial	Windows
SWFTools	April 8, 2012	Matthias Kramm	GPL-2.0-or-later	Windows, OS X, Linux
Ajax Animator	December 31, 2011	Antimatter15	GPL-3.0-or-later	Web application
SWiSH Max	June 20, 2011	SwishZone	Trialware	Windows
RETAS		Celsys	Commercial proprietary software	Windows, OS X
ParticleIllusion			Trialware	Plug-in for Adobe After Effects
Flipnote Studio	December 24, 2008	Nintendo	Freeware	Nintendo DS
Flipnote Studio 3D	July 24, 2013	Nintendo	Freeware	Nintendo 3DS
Antics 2-D Animation	1998	Antics Workshop	Trialware	Windows
Autodesk Animator Pro	1995	Jim Kent	Freeware/Open source	MS-DOS, Windows
Autodesk Animator Studio	1995	Autodesk	Commercial proprietary software	MS-DOS, Windows
Fantavision	1988	Broderbund	Discontinued commercial proprietary software	Apple II, Amiga, Apple IIGS, MS-DOS
Glaxnimate	September 9, 2023	Mattia Basaglia	GPL-3.0-or-later	Linux, macOS, Windows, FreeBSD
FlipaClip		Visual Blasters	Freeware	Windows, macOS, Android, iOS
ToonSquid	July 29th, 2026	Keiwan Donyagard	Commercial proprietary software	iPadOS
Name	Last Stable Update	Developer	License	Operating system or environment

== See also ==
- List of 3D animation software
- List of 2D graphics software
