= Pencil2D =

Open source animation software

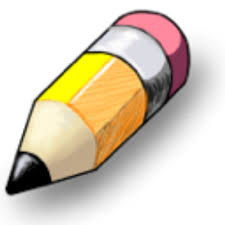
- An icon of the Pencil2D software of version 0.6.4., from 2016
- Original authors: Patrick Corrieri, Pascal Naidon
- Developers: Matthew Chang and others
- Release: 2005; 21 years ago
- Stable release: 0.7.2 / 13 March 2026
- Written in: C++ Qt
- Operating system: Windows, macOS, Unix-like
- Platform: Cross-platform
- Size: 36–58 MiB (varies by operating system)
- Type: 2D animation software
- License: GPL-2.0-only
- Website: https://www.pencil2d.org/
- Repository: github.com/pencil2d/pencil

Pencil2D is a free and open-source 2D animation software for Windows, macOS, and Unix-like operating systems. It is released under the GNU General Public License and uses the Qt framework. It is used for making cartoons using traditional techniques (tracing drawings, onion skinning, etc), managing vector and bitmap drawings.

With this animation software, the user can export files in its own native file format, as well exporting it as a sequence of images (PNG, JPEG, BMP, or TIFF) and also in a video file (AVI, MP4, WebM, GIF, or APNG).

== History ==
The original version of the software was called Pencil, created by Patrick Corrieri and Pascal Naidon in 2005, but was abandoned and discontinued in 2009. The abandonment of the project led to the creation of numerous forks, several of which were eventually merged into that of Matthew Chang, resulting in the project now known as Pencil2D.

The project then continues on the pencil2D.org site. From spring 2019, changes are made to the organization of updates, with the deletion of the CR, and the implementation of regular updates whose version numbers are even with patches, and more occasionally, odd versions adding features. The goal is to quickly fix bugs as soon as they appear, rather than letting them accumulate, and to offer stability fixes more quickly. It started with version 0.6.4, released in May 2019. The developers are also setting up a project upload page in order to establish a multitude of tests for debugging and validity tests.

== Reception ==
In 2025, Paul Hatton of Creative Bloq, praised its accessibility and simplicity in animating but criticised the lack of keyframe animation tools. Which results in limited adjustments to animate, like the ability to use curves to adjust its speed.

== See also ==
- List of 2D animation software
- FlipaClip
