= Moho (software) =

Vector-based animation software

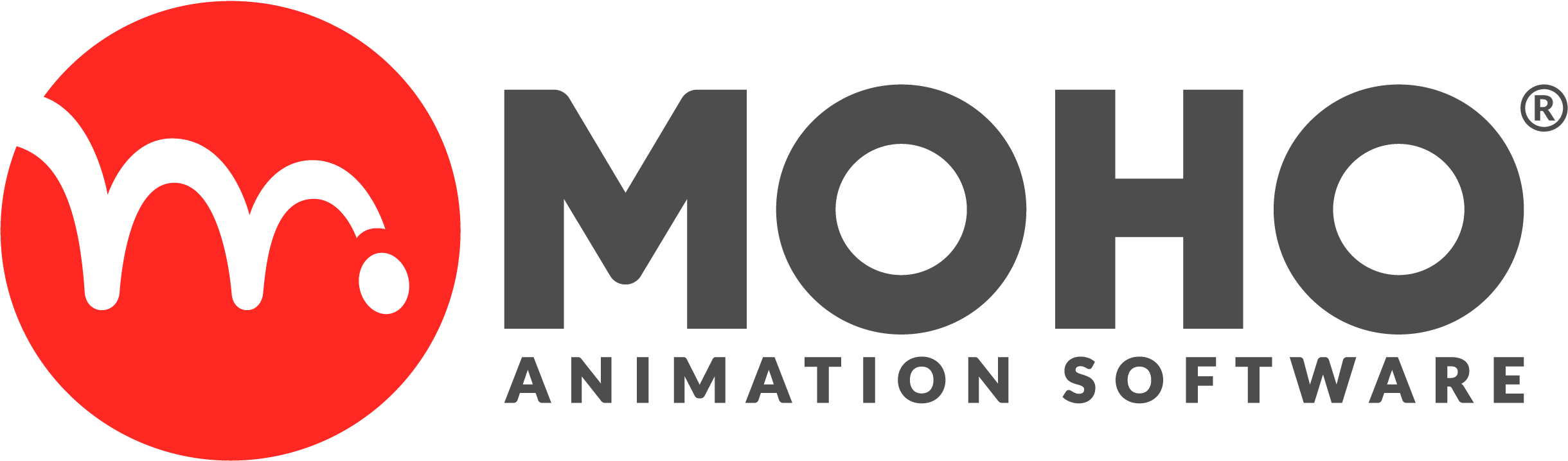
- Original author: Mike Clifton
- Developer: Lost Marble LLC
- Stable release: Windows: 14.4, Mac: 14.4 / 11 November 2025; 11 months ago
- Written in: C++, Lua
- Operating system: Windows, macOS
- Type: Animation software
- License: Proprietary, trialware
- Website: mohoanimation.com

Moho (formerly marketed as Anime Studio) is a proprietary vector-based 2D Computer animation software.

== History ==
The software was originally developed under the name "Moho" in 1999 by Mike Clifton at Lost Marble. The software was distributed by E Frontier until 2007, when it was acquired by Smith Micro Software and renamed to Anime Studio.

2010
Smith Micro released Anime Studio 7, which added features such as physics, 3D creation, and an improved interface.
2011
Anime Studio 8 added features such as the character Wizard, layered Photoshop import, and real-time media connection. Version 8.1 also supported the new Poser 9 SDK and integrated the Wacom multi-touch API, allowing it to work natively with Wacom's Bamboo and Intuos tablets.
2012
Smith Micro released Anime Studio 9, with new features including smart bones, editable motion graphs, and bézier handles. It also included enhancements to the timeline, keyframes, and onion skin.
2014
Anime Studio 10 contained upgraded features and new mechanics to its predecessor. Some of these include new drawing tools, improved inverse kinematics, squash & stretch, and rendering improvements. Version 10.1 added the ability to copy keyframes between similar characters.
2015
Anime Studio 11 added frame-by-frame animation, layer referencing, animated shape ordering, enhanced tools and brushes, JSON file format support, and other features.
2016
Anime Studio was rebranded as its original name Moho by Smith Micro Software to reflect the software's ability to create more animated content than anime.
Moho 12 was released with pin bones, optimized bézier handles, improved free hand tools, smart warp, real motion blur, and more. Moho Pro 12 was released in August 2016. In October 2016, Moho became available for the Microsoft Surface Studio. Smith Micro worked with Microsoft to develop Moho functionality for the Surface Dial peripheral. This feature set enabled users to create animations more quickly and easily through functions such as a new overlay timeline, rigged characters, rotating canvases, and frame-by-frame animation.
2019
June, Moho 13 introduced new bitmap tools, including bitmap frame to frame capabilities, and re-engineered 3D object support.
2020
22 December, it was announced that the Moho 2D animation software had been acquired by Lost Marble LLC, a company founded by Mike Clifton, the original creator of Moho, Victor Paredes, Supervisor of Moho animation at Cartoon Saloon and former Moho Product Manager and Fahim Niaz, Founder at Graphixly LLC and former Moho Product Manager.
2021
26 April, Lost Marble LLC released Moho 13.5, with new features including Vitruvian Bones, Wind Dynamics, Quad meshes, and a slightly refreshed user interface.
2023
12 September, Lost Marble LLC released Moho 14, with new features including a new graphics engine, improved drawing and frame-by-frame tools, liquid shapes, curvers, new freehand styles, smart line boil, easier follow through and overlapping with dynamics, delayed constraints, an updated scripting interface, a better timeline, and improved SVG support and user interface.

Version	Release date	Publisher	Improvements, features
1.0	June 1, 1999	LostMarble	Initial release
1.1	September 20, 1999	LostMarble	
2.2	January 8, 2001	LostMarble	Mac OS Version, Switch layers
3.0	November 30, 2001	LostMarble	Particles, Image Wrapping, Layer masks, Modeless UI, Onion skins, Virtual Camera with depth effect image warping
4.0	November 24, 2002	LostMarble	Graphical animation curves, Bone constraints, Batch rendering, Audio support, Object naming, Keyframe scaling, Resizable projects
5.0	October 9, 2004	LostMarble	Improved SWF Export, New Layer Types, Actions, Styles, LUA script system
5.6	2006	LostMarble	Introduction of lip-synching, Flash output, improved text, Illustrator import, vector drawing tools
6.0	June 9, 2009	Smith Micro	Built-in lip-syncing and sequencer, improved interface
6.1	September 22, 2009	Smith Micro	Upload to Facebook, French and German versions, the ability to enter non-English characters in text fields.
7.0	June 9, 2010	Smith Micro	Improvements to physics, 3D creation, interface
7.1	October 13, 2010	Smith Micro	Contains several fixes including switch layer fix
8.0	June 8, 2011	Smith Micro	Character wizard, layered Photoshop import, real-time media connection, support for Poser 9 SDK, integrated Wacom multi-touch API
8.1	July 7, 2011	Smith Micro	Fixes to the library window, mouse focus, window-location memory, stroke construction when welding curves closed, some layer masking issues, auto-save issues that cause bone rigs to occasionally reset themselves
9.0	September 10, 2012	Smith Micro	Features like smart bones, editable motion graphs, bézier handles, enhancements to the timeline, key frames, onion skin
9.1	October 22, 2012	Smith Micro	Fixed a problem where deleting a style could sometimes lead to a crash; fixed issue related to specifying a user-content location on first launch; rendered RLE AVI now imports properly into AS; revamped script management
9.2	January 9, 2013	Smith Micro	Updated English manuals for Debut and Pro; changes can be applied to multiple layers; added buttons to reveal source images and audio; fixed Lua DLL module loading
9.5	August 12, 2013	Smith Micro	Smart Bones enhancements; nested Layer controls with more hierarchical control over rigs; flexi-binding isolate tshe influence of bones; depth shifting helps preserve the size of objects; viewing of real-time changes on the canvas; switch layer enhancements
10.0	March 6, 2014	Smith Micro	Updated content library with free characters, props, scenes, enhanced drawing tools, multiple document support, combined bone tools, combined point tools, point hiding, edit multiple Layers simultaneously, automatic updates
10.1	July 25, 2014	Smith Micro	The application now runs in English, German, or Spanish; fixed over 200 bugs; layers can be copied and pasted between documents; added an image layer cropping tool
10.2	October 13, 2014	Smith Micro	Several bug fixes (no blog post to specify exact features or fixes)
10.3	March 25, 2014	Smith Micro	Several bug fixes (no blog post to specify exact features or fixes)
11.0	June 3, 2015	Smith Micro	Vector-based draw, paint and fill tools, bone rigging, animation timeline, audio recording, sound effects, improved lip-syncing
11.1	July 15, 2015	Smith Micro	Several bug fixes (no blog post to specify exact features or fixes)
11.2	January 4, 2016	Smith Micro	Added a tool to sketch bones; added additive cycles; many bug fixes
12.0	August 4, 2016	Smith Micro	Bone-rigging, timeline, enhanced drawing tools, improved audio recording, sound effects, automatic lip-synching, beginner mode, character wizard, automatic image tracing, path tool, motion tracking, multi-touch support, multiple document support
12.1	October 18, 2016	Smith Micro	New 4K ultra HD and 4K digital cinema dimension presets; improved smoothing for freehand strokes; many bug fixes
12.2	November 15, 2016	Smith Micro	Added support for Microsoft Surface Studio and Surface Dial, new Layer Comps window, fixed bug where sometimes PSD layers were lost, fixed bug where a duplicated vector layer didn’t show Bezier handles
12.3	September 10, 2017	Smith Micro	Ability to paste images from the clipboard to create new image layers, new document preferences and bug fixes
12.4	November 23, 2017	Smith Micro	Switch layer interpolation now works on nested layers (group and switch); re-sync all channels; triangulated mesh layers now have a distinct layer icon for easy distinction; several bug fixes
12.5	October 4, 2018	Smith Micro	Many bug fixes (no blog post to specify exact features or fixes)
12.5.1	November 14, 2018	Smith Micro	Bug fix release for Mac only to support changes in macOS 10.10 and above
13.0	June 25, 2019	Smith Micro	Introduced improved bitmap tools including bitmap brushes and frame by frame support, improved handling of 3D objects
13.0.1	August 20, 2019	Smith Micro	Multiple bug fixes
13.0.2	September 26, 2019	Smith Micro	Bug fixes and usability improvements
13.5	April 26, 2021	Lost Marble LLC	Introduced Vitruvian Bones, Wind Dynamics, Quad meshes, UI refresh, bug fixes and usability improvements. The 13.5 release was based on an upgrade from Moho 12.5, thus regressed some of the new incomplete features (Bitmap tools, enhanced Actions, new 3D object engine) introduced in the earlier Moho 13 release
13.5.1	June 25, 2021	Lost Marble LLC	New options to create masks. New Blending modes Soft Light and Color Dodge to improve the compatibility with Adobe Photoshop, Clip Studio Paint, other graphic software; bug fixes
13.5.2	November 9, 2021	Lost Marble LLC	Improved Photoshop PSD file handling, faster, more stable, more flexible than ever with support for layer masks, enhanced video and audio media import and export, Live Mesh creation and Auto-triangulation, Deep Frame Copy-Paste, new 13.5 characters added to library, bug fixes, other usability improvements
14.0	September 12, 2023	Lost Marble LLC	Introduced new Graphics Engine, improved drawing and frame-by-frame tools, Liquid Shapes, Curvers, New Freehand Styles, Smart Line Boil, easier Follow Through and Overlapping with Dynamics, Delayed Constraints, Updated Scripting Interface, better Timeline and frame-by-frame animation, improved SVG Import and user interface
14.4	November 11, 2025	Lost Marble LLC	

== Notable uses ==
=== Feature films ===
- Romeo & Juliet: Sealed with a Kiss (Phil Nibbelink Productions) - 2006
- Até ao Tecto do Mundo (Cine-Clube de Avanca) - 2007
- The Secret of Kells (Cartoon Saloon) - 2009
- Technotise: Edit & I (Yodi Movie Craftsman; Black, White & Green studio) - 2009
- Song of the Sea (Cartoon Saloon) - 2014
- The Breadwinner (Cartoon Saloon) - 2017
- Wolfwalkers (Cartoon Saloon) - 2020
- My Father's Dragon (Cartoon Saloon) - 2022
- Puffin Rock and the New Friends (Cartoon Saloon) - 2023
- Julián (film) (Cartoon Saloon) - 2025

=== Short films, TV and Web series ===
- Squirrel and Hedgehog (SEK Studio) - 2007
- Os Ecoturistinhas (TV-Rá-Tim-Bum) - 2008
- Old Fangs (Cartoon Saloon) - 2009
- Doutor Raio X (TV Rá-Tim-Bum) - 2011
- Isso Disso (TV Rá-Tim-Bum) - 2011
- PopPixie (RAI Studio) - 2011
- Winx Club (RAI Studio) - 2011
- Ant and Big Centipede (SEK Studio) - 2012
- Ants to Suri Mountain (SEK Studio) - 2012
- Eu e o Quarteto Apavorante (TV Rá-Tim-Bum) - 2013
- Somewhere Down the Line (Cartoon Saloon) - 2014
- The Ledge End of Phil: From Accounting (Cartoon Saloon) - 2014
- Boy General (SEK Studio) - 2015
- Two Boys who Found the Answer (SEK Studio) - 2015
- H2O: Mermaid Adventures on Netflix (Fantasia Animation) - 2015
- Puffin Rock (Cartoon Saloon) - 2015
- World of Winx on Netflix (RAI Studio) - 2016
- Late Afternoon (Cartoon Saloon) - 2017
- Stitch & Ai (Panimation Hwakai Media/Showfun Animation) - 2017
- Our Class Lawn (SEK Studio) - 2018
- DJ Cão e a Loja de Discos (TV Rá-Tim-Bum) - 2019
- There's a Monster In My Kitchen (Cartoon Saloon) - 2020
- Clever Raccoon Dog (SEK Studio) - 2021
- Invincible (Skybound Entertainment/SEK Studio) - 2021
- Star Wars: Visions: Screecher’s Reach (Cartoon Saloon/Lucasfilm) - 2023
- Scavengers Reign on Max/Netflix (Titmouse) - 2023
- Judas Iscariot (Studio Stigmata) - 2025
- Éiru (Cartoon Saloon) - 2025

== See also ==
- List of 2D animation software
- Manga Studio
