= Ajax Animator =

Web-based animation suite

- Original authors: Antimatter15, brwainer, others
- Developer: Antimatter15
- Stable release: 0.20.05 Wave / 31 December 2011
- Written in: JavaScript, HTML5, PHP, Java
- Available in: English
- Type: Vector graphics editor
- License: GPL-3.0-or-later
- Website: antimatter15.com/ajaxanimator/

Ajax Animator is a free, web-based animation suite. Ajax Animator was originally intended to be a free replacement to Flash MX, but is now a general-purpose animation tool. Ajax Animator is primarily written using JavaScript, the Ext JS framework, and HTML5-related technologies such as SVG. The software can be used either from within a web browser or from an offline installation.

== History ==
Ajax Animator's intended use was to draw stick figures and animate and export them to Flash files, as an alternative to the expensive Flash MX desktop program. It was first inspired by the Koolmoves Flash editing software. Development started around March 2006, based on the RichDraw JavaScript library, which allowed for in-browser graphics creation.

The application was soon rewritten to use the DHTML Suite library from Goodies, and finally allowed for exporting SWF files through the Freemovie Java library. Development subsequently moved to Subversion on Google Code to ease production.

Version 1.0 was rewritten to use version 1.0 of Sencha's Ext JS library instead. It also added support for inbetweening and sharing projects. The next version, 0.20, was a complete rewrite to support version 2.0 of Ext JS, and used the OnlyPaths library, which extended RichDraw and was designed specifically for Ajax Animator.

Later versions used the author's own VectorEditor library, based on the Raphaël framework.

== Animated GIF export ==
In July 2008, support for exporting animations to animated GIF format was added, alongside the existing SWF export.

== Google Wave integration ==
In 2009, a version of Ajax Animator was released as a gadget for Google Wave, allowing animations to be created and edited collaboratively within a Wave.

== Related projects ==
Development of Ajax Animator led to several smaller, related projects by the same author, including:

- stick2, a skeleton-based stop-motion stick-figure animator
- jsgif, a browser-based port of the AS3GIF library for generating animated GIFs entirely client-side
- jsvectoreditor, a cross-browser vector graphics editor built on the Raphaël library
- scratchpad, a simple cross-browser scratchpad later used by the Khan Academy
- forkswif, a prototype SWF-authoring tool written in C#, based on swfmill and svgpaint

== Reception ==
Ajax Animator was featured by technology sites MakeUseOf and InfoQ shortly after its initial 0.2 release in 2008.

== See also ==
- List of 2D animation software
