= Guardians of the Lost Code =

- Film poster
- Spanish: Brijes 3D
- Directed by: Benito Fernández
- Written by: Luis Antonio Ávalos
- Produced by: Charbel Harp Calderoní; Ricardo González Duprat; Alfredo Harp Calderoní; Ray Zone
- Starring: José A. Toledano; Alondra Hidalgo; Miguel Calderón
- Cinematography: Benito Fernández
- Edited by: Diego Fernández; Edith Sanchez
- Music by: Juan Manuel Langarica
- Production companies: Fidecine; Santo Domingo Animation
- Distributed by: Videocine (Mexico); Synkronized (United States)
- Release date: September 16, 2010 (Mexico)
- Running time: 89 minutes
- Countries: Mexico; United States
- Languages: Spanish; English

Guardians of the Lost Code (Spanish: Brijes 3D) is a 2010 animated adventure film, created by Ricardo González Duprat, distributed by Videocine.

== Plot ==
During a field trip to the history museum, the students Freddy, Atzi, and Kimo discover a giant stone disk called the Codex in the storage room they are exploring. Three of the brijes within it, the deities Quetzalcoatl, Ra and Chu Jung, emerge and reveal to them that they are the three people chosen to restore the ancestral alliance between humans and brijes, an alliance that was fractured with the emergence of science and technology.

The brijes are magical animal spirits that have been in contact with human beings since the beginning of time. Every human had a brije; the human cared for his brije and vice versa. When the human turned 13, a human shaman taught both partners a bonding technique that allowed them to synchronize and transform into a warrior form, gaining extraordinary power allowing them to perform various acts of heroism. Unfortunately, with the birth of modern science and technology, this union was slowly severed as humans stopped believing in magic, leading to tragic results. The brijes in the Codex created and sealed themselves within it to protect the knowledge of the warrior form bonding technique from the forces of darkness that seek it.

To fulfill their mission, the Codex presents the chosen ones with their respective brijes (Hopper, Cloko and Bri) and shows them clues that will lead them to find the missing piece of the same to activate it. With their brijes and the help of Quetzalcoatl, Ra and Chu Jung, the chosen ones begin their journey through space and time to find the missing piece of the Codex, all while fighting against the forces of darkness.

== Voice cast ==
Character	Voice actor
Freddy	José A. Toledano
Atzi	Alondra Hidalgo
Kimo	Miguel Calderón
Hopper and Freddy's Warrior Form	Héctor Emmanuel Gómez
Cloko and Kimo's Warrior Form	Óscar Flores
Bri and Atzi's Warrior Form	Karla Falcón
Elmer	José Luis Orozco
Zom Pol Balam	Emilio Treviño
Zom Pol Balam (Warrior form)	Édgar Vivar
Púas	Carlos Espejel
Fangs and Púas Warrior Form	Jesse Conde

== Production ==
This Mexican-American animated adventure film uses both traditional animation and computer animation, produced by Santo Domingo Animation and directed by Benito Fernández, his directorial debut. The pre-production work was done in Toon Boom Storyboard Pro (animatics and storyboards). The post-production was done in Adobe After Effects (compositing and visual effects), Adobe Photoshop (background art), Autodesk Maya (computer animation), DigiCel FlipBook (clean-up animation), Pencil and Paper (hand drawn rough animation) and Toonz 4.0 (digital ink-and-paint) to create a hybrid of 2D animation and 3D animation.

== Music ==
The film's original score was composed by Juan Manuel Langarica. Notable songs also use several scenery tracks such as Sweet Dreams Are Made Of This 91' Remix by Eurythmics, Puttin' On The Ritz by Taco Ockerse, Oh Yeah by Yello, Blitzkrieg Bop by Ramones, Godzilla by Blue Öyster Cult and AbraCadabra by Steve Miller Band credits only.

== Release ==
This film was released in Mexico on September 16, 2010.

== Critical reception ==
Not many critics reviewed this film, but the ones who did gave generally negative reviews. A negative review came from Common Sense Media, who gave it two stars out of five.
