= Julián (film) =

2026 animated film

- 2026 Annecy International Animation Film Festival poster
- Directed by: Louise Bagnall
- Screenplay by: Juliany Taveras
- Based on: Julián Is a Mermaid by Jessica Love
- Produced by: Nora Twomey; Tomm Moore; Paul Young; Anthony Leo; Andrew Rosen; Stéphane Roelants; Fabien Renelli; Charlotte de la Gournerie; Lewis Taylor
- Starring: Knyght Darius Jack; Milcania Diaz-Rojas; Naomi Diaz; Lisa-Kainde Diaz
- Edited by: Richie Cody; Owen Peters
- Music by: La-Nai Gabriel
- Production companies: Cartoon Saloon; Mélusine Productions; Aircraft Pictures; Sun Creature Studio
- Distributed by: Angel Distribution; Anime Limited; Arthaus; Folkets Bio; Gébéka Films; JEF; Wildcard Distribution; Young Horizons; Elevation Pictures; GKids
- Release date: June 23, 2026 (Annecy)
- Running time: 85 minutes
- Countries: Ireland; Canada; Denmark; Luxembourg; United Kingdom
- Languages: English; Spanish

Julián is a 2026 animated urban fantasy film directed by Louise Bagnall, written by Juliany Taveras, and adapted from Jessica Love's 2018 children's book Julián Is a Mermaid. The film tells the story of Julián (Knyght Darius Jack), a young boy spending the summer in Brooklyn with his Dominican American grandmother Carmela (Milcania Diaz-Rojas), whom he barely knows, with their early conflicts growing into a loving and supportive bond as she helps him in his desire to be a mermaid in the Coney Island Mermaid Parade. The cast also includes Nami Diaz and Lisa-Kainde Diaz.

Like other Cartoon Saloon films, Julián is an international co-production between several other companies. Bagnall, a Cartoon Saloon animator, first read Julián Is a Mermaid in 2018 and pitched an adaptation to the studio. Together with Love and Taveras, they expanded the original story introducing fantastical elements while keeping its themes about expression and cultural heritage intact. To present the story as if it were through young Julián's eyes, the art direction incorporated heavy use of coloring pencils and markers.

The film premiered in June 2026 at the 2026 Annecy International Animation Film Festival in June 2026 and had its North American premiere at the 2026 Toronto International Film Festival.

== Premise ==
The film tells the story of Julián, a young boy spending the summer in Brooklyn with his Dominican American grandmother Carmela, whom he barely knows, with their early conflicts growing into a loving and supportive bond as she helps him in his desire to be a mermaid in the Coney Island Mermaid Parade.

== Voice cast ==
- Knyght Darius Jack as Julián
- Milcania Diaz-Rojas as Carmela
- Nami Diaz
- Lisa-Kainde Diaz.
- Zariah Georgia Ellis
- Emma So
- Avery Star Pryce Tibayan
- Kim Roberts
- Stephanie Herrera
- Yanna McIntosh
- Anthony Sardinha
- Manuel Rodriguez-Saenz
- Jordan Mazeral

== Production ==
=== Development and story ===
In December 2022, Irish animation studio Cartoon Saloon announced it would release a film adaptation of Jessica Love's book, 2014 children's book Julián Is a Mermaid. Cartoon Saloon animator Louise Bagnall directs the film in her feature directorial debut. Bagnall first read Julián Is a Mermaid in 2018 and began to seriously consider adapting it in 2020. She described being attracted to the project due to the themes, poignancy, and visuals of Love's original story. The film is an international co-production between Cartoon Saloon and several other production companies: Primarily Aircraft Pictures in Canada, Sun Creature Studio in Denmark, and Mélusine Productions in Luxemborg. In April 2026, it was announced that Zoe Saldaña and her sisters Cisely and Mariel had joined the production as executive producers through their studio Cinestar Pictures.

Due to the challenges of adapting a short children's book into a full-length feature film, Bagnall worked with Love and screenwriter Juliany Taveras to expand the story with authentic representations of Brooklyn Latino, as well as adapting the original book's art style to a more effective cinematic presentation.

When adding the fantastical elements to the adaptation, it was important that they helped inform Julián's understanding of himself and the themes of the story. Through the goddess figure, Yemayá, the title character is allowed to express himself outside of gendered social norms as well as form a deeper connection to his Dominican heritage. Bagnall loved the idea of having a divine femininity at the heart of the story. Recognizing the queer coding of the original story, for Bagnall, it was also important that the film was not too concerned with pasting any explicit labels on Julián.

=== Animation ===
Julián was animated across Cartoon Saloon and several other studions with TVPaint software used for a majority of the animation, Moho for rigged animation and Toon Boom for effects. At its peak 55 people were working on the feature in-house

Emilie Bach was the art director on the film and helped to inform a lot of the design choices. According to Bagnall, she kept Love's style of linework, but changed the coloring from Love's gouache and watercolor to the use of coloring pencils and markers, so as to more effectively present the film through Julián's eyes, as well as drawing some inspiration from the color palette and cinematography of the Brooklyn-set drama film Do the Right Thing. Unlike many past Cartoon Saloon films, Julián is set in a more contemporary urban environment. For the team, it was important that the Brooklyn setting was designed to look "lived in" and a little rough around the edges.

Depicting the Coney Island Mermaid Parade was one of the more challenging parts of the production. The team had to figure out creative solutions to creating a large, complex scene with populated with several characters, floats, and many moving parts all within their limited resources as an independent production. One such solution was deciding what each shot of the sequence would be like and designing incidentals for that shot and the shot alone. A solution Bach came up with was having colored, patterned fabrics fill in spaces that would otherwise have more characters.

=== Casting ===
The film's voice cast also includes Zariah Georgia Ellis, Emma So, Avery Star Pryce Tibayan, Kim Roberts, Stephanie Herrera, Yanna McIntosh, Anthony Sardinha, Manuel Rodriguez-Saenz, Jordan Mazeral, Lisa Kainde and Naomi Diaz.

== Distribution ==
In May 2025, the film was previewed as part of the Cannes Film Festival's Annecy Animation Showcase. The film premiered in June 2026 at the 2026 Annecy International Animation Film Festival, and had its North American premiere at the 2026 Toronto International Film Festival.

The film will also screen at the Windsor International Film Festival, in competition for the $25,000 WIFF Prize in Canadian Film.

The film has been acquired for commercial theatrical distribution in various countries, including by Gebeka Films in France, Elevation Pictures in Canada, Anime Limited in the United Kingdom, Wildcard Distribution in Ireland and GKIDS in the United States.

=== Critical response ===
On the review aggregator website Rotten Tomatoes, 93% of 15 critics' reviews are positive, with an average rating of 7.4/10.

Wendy Ide of Screen Daily wrote that "warmth permeates Louise Bagnall’s vibrant, joyful coming-of-age picture Julián, the latest animation from Ireland’s Cartoon Saloon. It radiates from the screen in the sunbaked pavements of summer time Brooklyn, where kids scrawl chalk drawings and grannies do battle with dominoes. And it is infused in the story of a little boy’s self-discovery, his creative expression and the love and acceptance he encounters. Adapted from the acclaimed LGBTQ+ themed children’s book Julián is a Mermaid by Jessica Love, this is a film whose message is delivered with an embrace rather than a lecture."

For the International Cinephile Society, Matthew Joseph Jenner wrote that "Regardless of how you look at it – whether as a charming little curio about celebrating cultural diversity or as a deeper, more profound exploration of a young boy finding himself – Julián is a truly wonderful film, and Bagnall proves that she is someone to be watched going forward. The film doesn’t need an outrageous premise or particularly complex execution to be effective, since the story is primarily what draws us in and makes us fall madly in love with these characters. The specific meaning of the film can be left open to interpretation (Bagnall allows for some flexibility in this regard, giving each viewer the chance to engage with the story on their own terms), but it does function mostly as an allegorical tale of finding your identity, using familiar coming-of-age techniques to become this gentle but life-affirming story of individuality."
