= Pivot Animator =

2D animation software

- Pivot Animator 4 running on Windows Vista
- Developer: Peter Bone
- Release: June 13, 2001; 25 years ago
- Stable release: 5.2.11 / May 13, 2025; 15 months ago
- Written in: Delphi
- Operating system: Windows
- Type: Graphics software
- License: Freeware
- Website: pivotanimator.net

Pivot Animator (formerly Pivot Stickfigure Animator and usually shortened to Pivot) is a freeware application that allows users to create stick-figure and sprite animations, and save them in the animated GIF format for use on web pages and the AVI format (in Pivot Animator 3 and later).

Pivot provides a simple, easy to use interface with a few features. It uses fixed-length 'sticks' to ensure size consistency during animation.

== Development and history ==
=== First release (2001) ===
The first version of Pivot Animator had several software bugs. Stick figures were limited to one type of stick figure, the default stick figure. Animations could be saved in the PIV (Pivot Project File) or exported as Animated .GIF (Graphics Interchange Format) files. Users were given few options of image optimization, compression or resizing when saving their animation. This was one of the first animation programs available on the computer.

=== Pivot 2.2 (2005-2006) ===
The second major release of the Pivot Stickfigure Animator. This version implemented the 'Stick Figure Builder', which allowed users to create their own stick figure designs saved in the STK format. This allowed a much wider scope of animation choice for Pivot users. It also fixed a few minor bugs, added the buttons to the main interface to bring a stick figure in front or behind other figures, and could automatically check to make sure the user did not lose any unsaved projects.

=== Pivot 3.1 Beta (2007–2008) ===
This release was sent intentionally to the Pivot Animation groups for testing but the version was leaked from various unofficial sources to the general public. There was an improved interface, with new icons, a better default stickman with a thicker body, and a reorganization of the features. New features included the ability to import any image into the animation. Another added feature was the ability to have multiple backgrounds in an animation. When a user saves a .piv file, the frame rate is saved with it.

=== Pivot 4.1 (2013) ===
Pivot 4.1 beta was released on January 2, 2013, with new features including:

- Figure opacity
- Extended canvas area
- Multi-select and edit figures
- Stretch segments using the Ctrl key
- Rotate/scale figures using the Alt key
- Image based figure and background selector
- Split a segment into 2 in the figure builder
- Copy and paste frames
- Improved GIF export options and quality
- AVI video export
- Join figures tool
- PNG support for sprites and backgrounds
- Keyboard shortcuts
- Multiple languages and the ability to create custom translations
- Multiple frame onion skins (0-9)
- Undo / redo
- Image preview of Stk files when loading figures

Pivot Animator 4.1.10 was released as the "stable" version of 4.1 and is still the latest non-beta version so far (as of October 2015).

Pivot 4.2 was announced on December 23, 2014 followed by a beta release on January 1, 2015. New features include copying and pasting selected stick figures and sprites, a transparent figure builder window, and the ability to export images in the Scalable Vector Graphics format.

=== Pivot 5.1 (2021) ===
Pivot 5.1 beta was released in July 2021, with several new features including:

- Frame inbetweening
- Bendy line segments
- Canvas zoom
- Virtual camera
- Colour and Gradient backgrounds
- Text tool
- Multiple colours and sprites per figure
- Much higher segment limit per figure (30,000)
- Polyfill tool
- Segment colour gradients
- Figure outlines
- Ability to modify existing figure types
- Status bar info at bottom of main window
- Animated PNG export
- WMV, WEBM, MP4 and lossless FFV1 video export
- STK figure file preview in Windows Explorer
- Faster and smoother graphics using the GPU

Pivot Animator 5 requires Windows 10 and a GPU.

== See also ==
- List of 2D animation software
