= Jessica Love =

American theater actress, author, and illustrator (born 1982)

- Born: 1982 (age 43–44)
- Education: University of California, Santa Cruz (BFA); Juilliard School (MFA)
- Occupations: theater actress, author, and illustrator
- Writing career
- Notable work: Julián Is a Mermaid
- Website: jesslove.format.com

Jessica Love (born 1982) is an American theater actress, author, and illustrator. She is best known for her debut children's picture book Julián is a Mermaid, which has won the Stonewall Book Award and Klaus Flugge Prize. All of her books are LGBTQ+ friendly.

== Biography ==
Love grew up in Southern California, raised by her parents, who were quite artistic. She attended the University of California Santa Cruz, where she received a Bachelor of Fine Arts degree. She then attended Juilliard's drama program and graduated with her master's in 2009.

Before publishing her first book, Julián is a Mermaid, in 2018, Love worked as an actress in New York City for thirteen years. She refers to her book as "her backstage baby," as she worked on it between a Jez Butterworth's The River (2014) and Julia Cho's Aubergine at Playwrights Horizons (2016). During this time, she spent five years writing and illustrating Julián is a Mermaid before finding a publisher.

Love currently lives in Hudson Valley with her partner, Daniel, and their son. She and Daniel were friends for twenty years before they became romantically involved, and they have been together for the last five years.

== Style ==
Love hand illustrated each of her books using ink, gouache, and watercolor. An interesting aspect of her Julián books is she uses brown paper. She tried white paper originally, however she says, "something about it just wasn't working." When first starting to write Julián is a Mermaid, Love states that it "was going to be entirely wordless.. but it became clear to me as I showed early sketches of the book to people that there was some information that was missing, and without it the story wouldn't actually make sense.” Now she has included some words, but has been very careful to not overwrite the book or take your focus away from the illustrations.

In her newest book A Bed of Stars she explored her creativity in a more natural aspect looking at the nature around her.

== Inspiration ==
Love has stated she is most inspired by the work of Maurice Sendak, Hillary Knight, Bill Waterson, Shel Silverstein, John Klassen, Mac Barnett, and Carson Ellis.

== Books ==
=== Julián is a Mermaid (2018) ===
Julián is a Mermaid, published May 22, 2018 by Candlewick Press, is about a little boy riding a bus with his grandma when he notices three women dressed up as mermaids (colorful and beautiful) and goes home to dress up like a mermaid. The story follows how he feels about himself and how his abuela feels about her grandson discovering another aspect of himself.

Love's inspiration for Julián is a Mermaid, was a friend who transitioned later on in life. Love was inspired by his story and the struggles he had to go through to live his life as his truest self. After hearing his story and starting to understand drag through Paris is Burning, she wanted to create a story about how the love of a community affects a child's view of themselves.

Julián, an animated feature film adaptation of the book, premiered in June 2026 at the 2026 Annecy International Animation Film Festival.

=== Julián at the Wedding (2020) ===
In Julián at the Wedding, published October 6, 2020 by Candlewick Press, Julián and his abuela go to a wedding, where he makes a friend, Marisol. Together, they create mischief and understand the value of friends.

=== A Bed of Stars (2023) ===
A Bed of Stars, expected to be published April 4, 2023 by Candlewick Press, is about a father who goes camping in the desert with his child. Love has stated that line “shake hands with the universe” is best explains the book.

== Awards and honors ==
In 2018, Julián is a Mermaid was named one of the best children's books of the year by The Horn Book Magazine, Kirkus Reviews, NPR, Publishers Weekly, and TIME.

In 2020, Julián at the Wedding was named one of the best children's books of the year by Publishers Weekly.

Awards for Love's writing
Year	Title	Award	Result	Ref.
2018	Julián is a Mermaid	Children's Book NAIBA Book of the Year Award	Winner	
2018	Julián is a Mermaid	Opera Prima Bologna Children's Book Fair	Winner	
2019	Julián is a Mermaid	ALSC Notable Children's Books	Selection	
2019	Julián is a Mermaid	Anna Dewdney Read Together Award	Honor	
2019	Julián is a Mermaid	Bologna Ragazzi Award	Winner	
2019	Julián is a Mermaid	Carnegie Medal	Shortlist	
2019	Julián is a Mermaid	Ezra Jack Keats Book Award for Illustrator	Honor	
2019	Julián is a Mermaid	Klaus Flugge Prize	Winner	
2019	Julián is a Mermaid	Stonewall Book Award for Children's & Young Adult	Winner	

== Publications ==
=== As author ===
- Julián is a Mermaid (Candlewick Press, 2018)
  - Translations: Catalan, Portuguese, Italian, Chinese, Danish, German, Spanish, Finnish, Norwegian, Swedish, French, Japanese, Dutch, and Korean.
- Julián at the Wedding (Candlewick Press, 2022)
- A Bed of Stars (Candlewick Press, 2023)

=== As illustrator ===
- I Love You Because I Love You by Mượn Thị Văn (HarperCollins, 2022)
- Will it Be Okay? by Crescent Dragonwagon (HarperCollins, 2022)
