= DigiCel FlipBook =

2D animation software

- Developer: DigiCel Inc.
- Release: 1999; 27 years ago
- Stable release: 6.94 / December 21, 2016; 9 years ago
- Preview release: 7 / May 25, 2017; 9 years ago
- Operating system: Microsoft Windows, Mac OS X, iOS
- Size: 10 MB
- Available in: English
- Type: 2D animation
- License: Proprietary commercial software
- Website: digicel.net
- As of: February 2014

DigiCel FlipBook is 2D animation software that runs on Microsoft Windows or Mac OS X. (runs on MacOS Mojave or earlier, but not on recent MacOS Catalina, Big Sur, Monterey). There is a version for iOS called Digicel Flip-Pad. It is intended to closely replicate the traditional animation process, very similar to the likes of TVPaint Animation and Toon Boom Harmony.

== Features ==
FlipBook supports scanning physical drawings with a TWAIN-compliant scanner or webcam, or direct digital input via a Wacom tablet. In either case, the internal format is raster-based, not vector-based. Inbetweening is done using onion skinning. Each frame must be drawn separately; FlipBook intentionally does not support skeletal animation or morph target animation, as these are not part of the traditional animator's toolkit.

== Versions ==
FlipBook is available in four versions: Lite, Studio, Pro and Pro HD. The Lite edition supports one foreground and one background layer, one soundtrack, and up to three hundred frames per shot. The other editions support more layers, more frames, multiple soundtracks and higher output resolutions. Digicel Flipbook does not work on MacOS after Catalina (2019) but there is a version called DigiCel Flip-Pad which runs on iOS for iPad.

A free, full-featured demo version which produces watermarked output is also available for download.

== Credits and endorsements ==
FlipBook has been used on Titan A.E., The Simpsons Movie, Enchanted, The Princess and the Frog and others, and has been endorsed by Don Bluth.
