= Ray Zone =

American film historian, author and artist

- Born: May 16, 1947
- Died: November 13, 2012 (aged 65); Los Angeles, California, U.S.
- Children: 2
- Awards: Inkpot Award (1987)

Ray Zone (May 16, 1947 – November 13, 2012) was an American film historian, author, artist, and pioneer in methods of converting flat images (in particular, comic books) into stereoscopic images.

Starlog called him the "King of 3-D Comics", and Artsy Planet called him the "3D King of Hollywood".

== Biography ==
Zone attributed his interest in 3D to having read Mighty Mouse comic books in 3D at the age of 6, in 1953. He moved to Los Angeles in the early 1980s and began converting flat art to 3D images. He began working in comic books in 1983, and his early collaborations with Jack C. Harris and Steve Ditko drew the attention of Archie Goodwin, who recruited him to work with John Byrne on the 1990 Batman 3-D, a full-length 3D graphic novella. Zone produced 3D adaptations of art for over 150 comic books, for clients such as Disney, Warner Bros and the Simpsons, and including stories by Alan Moore and Grant Morrison which were specifically written to accommodate stereoscopy.

An internationally recognized expert in all things 3-D, Zone had a special interest in stereoscopic cinema and Large Format 3-D (15/70) filmmaking. He created stereo conversions and stereoscopic images for a wide variety of clients in publishing, education, advertising, television and motion pictures. In 2006 Zone was the 3D Artist on the Tool album 10,000 Days, which won that year's Grammy Award for Best Recording Package. He received numerous awards for his 3-D work, among them a 1987 Inkpot Award from San Diego Comic-Con for "Outstanding Achievement in Comic Arts".

He was the author of 3D Filmmakers, Conversations with Creators of Stereoscopic Motion Pictures (Scarecrow Press: 2005), Stereoscopic Cinema and the Origins of 3-D Film, 1838 - 1952 (University Press of Kentucky: 2007), 3-DIY: Stereoscopic Moviemaking on an Indie Budget (Focal Press: 2012), and 3-D Revolution: The History of Modern Stereoscopic Cinema (University Press of Kentucky: 2012).

In 2008 Zone worked as 3D Supervisor on Dark Country with director/star Thomas Jane, and in 2010 as 3D Producer on Guardians of the Lost Code, the first animated 3D feature film made in Mexico.

Zone died in 2012. He is survived by his sons Johnny and Jimmy Ray Zone. Johnny is the founder and owner of the fast-food restaurant chain Howlin' Ray's, which was named in his honor.

== Bibliography ==
Work includes:

- Batman 3D (with John Byrne, Arthur Adams, 80 pages, Titan Books, ISBN 1-85286-364-1)
- 3D Filmmakers, Conversations with Creators of Stereoscopic Motion Pictures, Scarecrow Press
- Stereoscopic Cinema and the Origins of 3-D Film, 1838 - 1952, University Press of Kentucky
- 3-DIY: Stereoscopic Moviemaking on an Indie Budget, Focal Press
- 3-D Revolution: The History of Modern Stereoscopic Cinema, University Press of Kentucky
