= Toni Senecal =

- Born: Antonia Francesca Senecal; July 11, 1969 (age 57)
- Occupations: Producer; host
- Spouse: Tracy Shea
- Children: 2

Antonia Francesca "Toni" Senecal (born July 11, 1969) is the producer and host of Toni On! television travel series which is broadcast on WLNY Saturdays at 7:30pm and Midnight as well as on WCBS-TV on Sundays at 5:30am. She won an Emmy in 2012 for Outstanding Writer of a program.

She first worked at the WB Networks and WPIX-TV New York's WB11 News at Ten for four years, until December 2005, then moved to Fox Networks Fox5 Channel 5 WNYW TV News at 10 and then moved to the CW Networks and CW11 News at 10. The WB Networks became the CW Networks while Toni was gone at Fox5. She covers award ceremonies such as the Emmy Awards, Academy Awards, and the Tony Awards.

Originally from Brookline, Massachusetts, Senecal moved to New York City to attend college. While an undergraduate at New York University, she dated nightclub impresario Rudolf. She also worked at nightclubs as a door person and was a well-known fixture on the New York club scene during her college years.

She has also made and has produced a series of one-half hour specials with her husband, Tracy Shea, for WPIX called Toni On!

There were several filmed documentaries including (Toni On! New York) (Toni On! Antarctica) (Toni On! Costa Rica) (Toni On! Alaska), (Toni On! Libya), (Toni On! Baja). Senecal and Shea traveled around the world to highlight interesting regions and culture, people, animals, natural wonders, etc. Her latest adventure was a half-hour documentary called Toni On Costa Rica which earned her a New York Emmy as Executive Producer for Educational Programming.

She has covered celebrations at Coney Island and was Queen Mermaid of the Coney Island Mermaid Parade where she wore a Mermaid costume.

In August 2006 Senecal co-hosted the syndicated television program Ebert & Roeper while film critic Roger Ebert was on medical leave.

On May 17, 2007, Toni and her husband Tracy welcomed their first son, Jericho Jack Thomas Shea. On September 22, 2011, they welcomed their second son, Maximus Amo Shea.
