= Louise Bagnall =

Irish filmmaker and animator

Louise Bagnall is an Irish filmmaker and animator who works as a creative director with Cartoon Saloon in Kilkenny.

== Career ==
Bagnall studied at the National Film School at the Dún Laoghaire Institute of Art, Design and Technology gaining a degree in Animation. She worked as a character designer on Cartoon Saloon’s The Breadwinner before writing and directing the 2019 Oscar-nominated short film Late Afternoon.

Julián, her feature film debut, premiered at the 2026 Annecy International Animation Film Festival.

Other short animated films Louise has directed include Cúl An Tí, Loose Ends and Donkey.

== See also ==
- Tomm Moore
- Nora Twomey
- Cinema of Ireland
