= Julián Is a Mermaid =

2018 picture book by Jessica Love

- Author: Jessica Love
- Illustrator: Jessica Love
- Language: English
- Genre: Children's picture book
- Publisher: Candlewick Press
- Publication date: April 2018
- Publication place: United States
- Awards: Stonewall Book Award; Klaus Flugge Prize
- ISBN: 978-0-7636-9045-8
- Website: Official website

Julián Is a Mermaid is an American children's picture book by Jessica Love. It tells the story of a boy who wants to become a mermaid and participate in the Coney Island Mermaid Parade. Love first began writing the book in 2014 while she worked as an actress, and it was published in 2018 by Candlewick Press.

The book received wide praise from critics, both for its emotional depth and the author's artistic decision to mix watercolor, gouache, and ink in her paintings, as well as for her usage of pastel tones against a more muted background. Julián Is a Mermaid was awarded the Stonewall Book Award and the Klaus Flugge Prize, and was highlighted in several "Best Of" lists.

== Plot ==
One day, while on the subway with his grandma, Julián sees some of the participants of the Coney Island Mermaid Parade. Julián becomes fascinated by them and dreams of becoming a mermaid swimming in the sea.

Back home, while his grandmother is showering, Julián designs a mermaid outfit with a variety of materials he finds at home, including a potted plant and window curtains. After leaving the bath, his grandmother gives what seems a disapproving look and leaves the room for a while, and returns with a smile on her face and a pearl necklace for Julián.

Afterwards, his grandmother takes him to the Coney Island Parade, where he walks along with other mermaids.

== Background ==
Love began writing Julián Is a Mermaid while working as an actress on a Jez Butterworth play in 2014. After writing an initial draft, she kept working on the art until 2016. At the time she considered self-publishing the book, but decided to look for an agent instead. During her debut on Broadway, she met with Mary-Louise Parker.

Parker helped Love find an agent who was willing to help publish her book. The book's draft, which was originally 45 pages, called "insanely long" by Love's agent, was sent to Candlewick Press, and later accepted for publishing. After that, Love decided to redraw the whole book on brown paper similar to kraft instead of white paper, believing it would be better for the warmer and pastel tones she used throughout her illustrations.

Love's initial plan was to have Julián meet with drag queens on their way to a drag ball, inspired by RuPaul's Drag Race, but in an interview with PinkNews, she said she changed the characters to mermaids, as her research uncovered the mythical creature's significance to transgender people: "There's something about mermaids. Who knows if that's because they're magical creatures who can live between two realities or because they don't have any genitals."

== Influences ==
Love says she was inspired to write the book when she met a former partner's older brother, who had transitioned a few years before Love began writing the book. According to Love, due to pushback from his family when younger, he was only able to transition after he was fifty years old. Talking to him inspired her to further research the LGBTQ community and a wider range of available literature.

The 1990 documentary Paris Is Burning, which tells the story of drag queens rejected by their families who found acceptance in a different place, was another inspiration. Love said in an interview with The Guardian that she wanted to write a story "about what [the drag queens'] lives would have been like if they'd received the kind of support from their birth families." She was inspired by "RuPaul's Drag Race" where people were expressing their true selves while dressing up, leading to the idea of utilizing a mermaid as the key figure.

Love also said growing up with queer role models – her aunt and her aunt's wife – had a positive impact on her family, and she "wanted to make a book that provided that kind of support and pride of place."

== Reception ==
Julián is a Mermaid was generally well received by critics, including starred reviews from Kirkus Reviews, Publishers Weekly, School Library Journal, and Shelf Awareness.

Many critics focused on the book's art style. Sarah Hunter, writing for Booklist, praised Love's use of muted backgrounds, which helped highlight the main scenes, as well as her "saturated, opaque tones tracing the graceful shapes of the figures."

Terry Hong, writing for Shelf Awareness, noted,

The words here are succinctly sparse; the art is spectacular, proof that a picture is worth a thousand words. ... Across her watercolor, gouache and ink spreads, Love captures the transformative power of being seen. Her affecting combination of the literary and the visual results in a powerful affirmation of individuality, creative expression and unconditional acceptance.

Minh Lê, writing for The Horn Book Magazine, called attention to the small details present in Love's drawings, such as "a wary look in the mirror," and how they add depth to Julián's story. He also praised the author's mix of watercolor, gouache, and ink.

Kirkus Reviews also praised Love's use of mixed techniques, calling it "perfect for this watercentric tale." It praises its "recognition and approval of [Julián's] gender nonconformity," as well as the fact that Spanish words are not italicized.

Amy McKay, in her review for The School Librarian, calls Love's illustrations "joyous" and the story "a true celebration of uniqueness," and praises her ability to tell the story with as little text as possible. McKay also highlights the emotional state of the main character, going from proud to anxious as the story develops, and "filling readers with empathy and hope for his acceptance." She also mentions Love's use of brown paper, which "make for a special reading experience."

The School Library Journal called it "[a] heartwarming must-have for one-on-one and small group sharing."

== Awards and honors ==
Several magazines and organizations have included Julián Is a Mermaid in "Best of" lists. The Horn Book Magazine, Kirkus Reviews, NPR, Publishers Weekly, and TIME included it on their lists of the best books of 2018. New York magazine included the book in a list titled "The Best Children's Books for LGBTQ+ Families, According to Experts," with one of the booksellers calling it "beautiful, simple and unapologetic." In a list for The New York Times, Linda Sue Park chose Love's debut book to feature on her list of "Picture Books to Help Kids Weather Our Age of Anxiety."

In 2018, Love was awarded the Silver Medal from the Society of Illustrators.

Awards for Julián Is a Mermaid
| Year | Award | Result | Ref. |
|---|---|---|---|
| 2018 | Children's Book NAIBA Book of the Year Award | Winner | |
| 2018 | Opera Prima Bologna Children's Book Fair | Winner | |
| 2019 | ALSC Notable Children's Books | Selection | |
| 2019 | Anna Dewdney Read Together Award | Honor | |
| 2019 | Bologna Ragazzi Award | Winner | |
| 2019 | Carnegie Medal | Shortlist | |
| 2019 | Ezra Jack Keats Book Award for Illustrator | Honor | |
| 2019 | Klaus Flugge Prize | Winner | |
| 2019 | Stonewall Book Award for Children's & Young Adult | Winner | |

== Film adaptation ==
In December 2022, Irish animation studio Cartoon Saloon announced it would release a film adaptation of the book entitled Julián. In May 2025, the film was previewed as part of the Cannes Film Festival's Annecy Animation Showcase. In April 2026, it was announced that Julián would have its premiere at that year's Annecy International Animation Film Festival.

== See also ==
- Transgender literature
