= TupiTube =

2D animation software

- TupiTube running on Windows 7
- Original author: MaeFloresta
- Developer: Gustav Gonzalez
- Stable release: 0.2.22 (TupiTube Desk); 1.0.8 (TupiTube App) / August 15, 2020; 6 years ago (TupiTube Desk)
- Written in: C++ / Qt
- Platform: Cross-Platform
- Type: Animation software
- License: GPL-2.0-or-later
- Website: www.tupitube.com
- Repository: github.com/xtingray/tupitube.desk

TupiTube (previously KTooN and Tupi 2D) is a free and open-source 2D animation software developed and maintained by the Colombian startup, Mae Floresta. It is available for Windows, Mac OS X, Linux and Android under the terms of the GNU GPL-2.0 or later license.

== Application editions ==
TupiTube - Android version of the software for mobile devices

TupiTube Desk - desktop version of the software for Windows, Mac OS X and Linux

== History ==
The KtooN software project was started by two Colombian animators in 2002 and was under continuous development until 2006. In 2009 the project was put on hold, but later redesigned and a new stable release was made available in 2010. Since then the project is no longer under active development.

Tupi (later rebranded as TupiTube) was started in 2010 as a fork of KTooN by its former co-developer. Later, Mae Floresta took over development of the project.

== Features ==
- Support for basic tools for vector illustration that includes rectangles, ellipses, lines, and polygons. Paths can also be created using the pen or pencil tool. The paint bucket tool can be used to fill bounded areas of vector objects.
- Raster images (sometimes called Bitmap) can be imported and used as either static backgrounds or animated assets.
- Finished animations can be exported to various file formats that include: OGG, AVI, MPEG, SWF. They may also be exported as a sequence of images in PNG, JPEG, or SVG format.
- Basic support for tweening of positions, colors, rotation, scale, shear, and opacity has been added to recent releases.

== See also ==
- List of 2D animation software
