= Coney Island Mermaid Parade =

Annual art parade in Coney Island

- Status: Active
- Genre: Parade
- Date: June
- Frequency: Annually
- Venue: Coney Island Boardwalk
- Locations: Coney Island, New York City
- Country: United States
- Inaugurated: June 1983
- Founder: Dick Zigun
- Most recent: June 20, 2026
- Attendance: 30,000
- Budget: $100,000
- Website: Coney Island Mermaid Parade

The Coney Island Mermaid Parade is an art parade held annually in Coney Island, Brooklyn, New York City. The event, the largest art parade in the United States, is held each year in June and celebrates the arrival of the summer season. Created and produced by the non-profit arts organization Coney Island USA, the 40th annual parade was held on June 18, 2022.

== Description ==
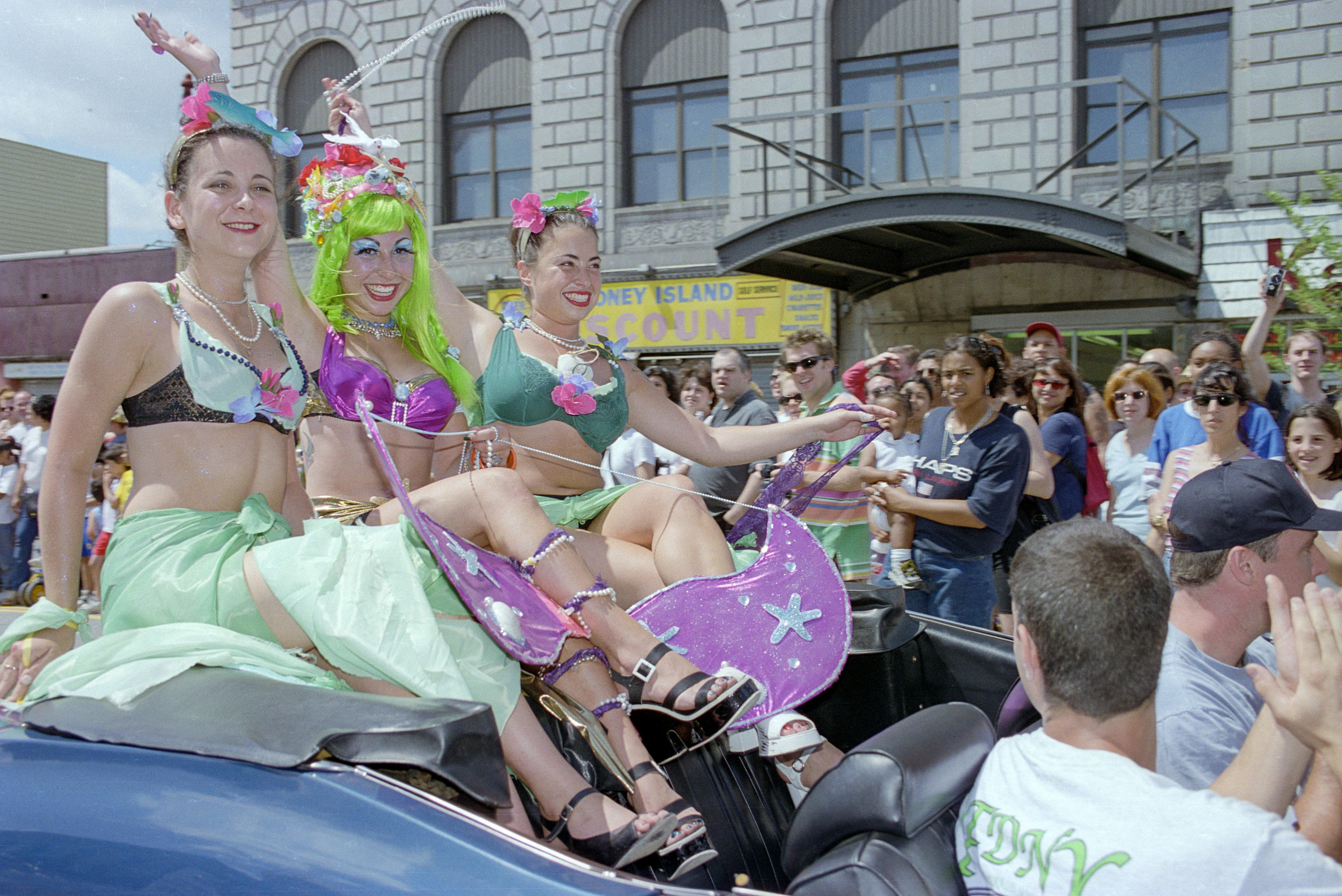
1998 Parade

Video from the 2019 parade

The Mermaid Parade traditionally takes place on the Saturday closest to the summer solstice, June 21, regardless of weather. Its intent is to celebrate self-expression, boost pride in Coney Island, and give New York artists a place to display their artwork. There are no ethnic, religious, or commercial aims.

The parade pays homage to the Coney Island Mardi Gras parades of the early 20th century. During this era, Coney Island was the primary amusement park destination for those in the New York metropolitan area. Like the annual Village Halloween Parade, the Mermaid Parade evokes the artistic spirit of Mardi Gras.

The event typically attracts about 3,000 participants and hundreds of thousands of spectators from all five boroughs of New York City. After the last participant passes the reviewing stand, parade founder Dick Zigun leads the procession to the beach for a ceremony representing the opening of the ocean for the summer swimming season.

== History ==
The tradition began in 1983, when the first event of this kind was conceptualized and organized by Dick Zigun, the founder of the non-profit arts organization Coney Island USA, who is sometimes dubbed the "Mayor of Coney Island."

The parade of June 22, 2013, was almost canceled due to a lack of money and resources following the recovery from Hurricane Sandy. It was rescued through a successful Kickstarter campaign along with a benefit concert that together raised $117,000, more than the $100,000 goal.

The 2020 parade was replaced by a virtual event (The Tail-a-Thon) due to the COVID-19 pandemic. The parade was delayed in 2021 to September 12 (marking the last weekend that lifeguards would be on duty at Coney Island) in order to improve the chances that it could be held, but on August 18 it was announced that the parade would be cancelled out of an abundance of caution due to a resurgence of COVID-19 in the region.

In 2026, the parade again faced financial difficulties. Coney Island USA raised $42,000+ through a GoFundMe campaign, allowing the parade to be held as scheduled. Additionally, Brooklyn Borough President Antonio Reynoso pledged $20,000 and committed to providing that same amount annually throughout his remaining time in office "to secure the future of the historic Mermaid Parade".

== Themes ==
The Mermaid Parade is known for marine costumes and occasional nudity (it is legal in New York State for women to be topless in public). There are sections in the parade for vehicles of all kinds, for floats, for groups, and for individuals. There are also family friendly and artsy categories. The organizers of the parade claim to encourage bribery, to give participants a more equal chance to win the various costume contests which are also part of the day's entertainment.

Each year the Mermaid Parade features a King Neptune and Queen Mermaid.

Annual	Year	King Neptune	Queen Mermaid
1st	1983	Al Mottola	Alison Gordy
2nd	1984	Joe Franklin	Jeanne Becker
3rd	1985	Dan Lurie	Sandra Frankel
4th	1986	John Bradshaw	Noni
5th	1987	Henry Stern	Barbara Walz
6th	1988	Michael Wilson	Phoebe Legere
7th	1989	David Smalls	Ilana Iguana
8th	1990	Mr. Fashion	Wendy Wild
9th	1991	El Vez	Lynda Barry
10th	1992	Richard Eagan	Daisy Eagan
11th	1993	-	Karen Duffy
12th	1994	Jose Gutierrez	Rosemary Di Pietra
13th	1995	Spyro Poulos	Shut-Up Shelly
14th	1996	Fred Kahl	Kiva Kahl
15th	1997	Ron Kuby	Jennifer Miller
16th	1998	David Byrne	The World Famous *BOB*
17th	1999	Curtis Sliwa	Queen Latifah
18th	2000	Rabbi Abraham Abraham	Katya Kahl
19th	2001	Hector Camacho Jr.	Kembra Pfahler
20th	2002	Marty Markowitz	Toni Senecal
21st	2003	Bill Evans	Kate Duyn
22nd	2004	Moby	Theo Kogan
23rd	2005	David Johansen	Karmen Guy
24th	2006	Abel Ferrara	Bambi the Mermaid
25th	2007	Adam Savage	Patti D'Arbanville
26th	2008	Reverend Billy Talen	Savitri Durkee
27th	2009	Harvey Keitel	Daphne Kastner
28th	2010	Lou Reed	Laurie Anderson
29th	2011	Adam Richman	Cat Greenleaf
30th	2012	Jackie "The Joke Man" Martling	Annabella Sciorra
31st	2013	Judah Friedlander	Carole Radziwill
32nd	2014	Dante de Blasio	Chiara de Blasio
33rd	2015	Mat Fraser	Julie Atlas Muz
34th	2016	Carlo A. Scissura	Hailey Clauson
35th	2017	Chris Stein	Deborah Harry
36th	2018	Neil Gaiman	Amanda Palmer
37th	2019	Arlo Guthrie	Nora Guthrie
38th	2020	Cancelled due to COVID-19	
39th	2021	Cancelled again due to COVID-19	
40th	2022	Dave Chokshi	Justin Vivian Bond
41st	2023	-	Laurie Cumbo
42nd	2024	Joe Coleman	Whitney Ward
43nd	2025	Eugene Hütz	Queenie Sateen
44th	2026	Jesse Malin	Rickie Lee Jones

== Gallery ==
Mermaid Parade through the years
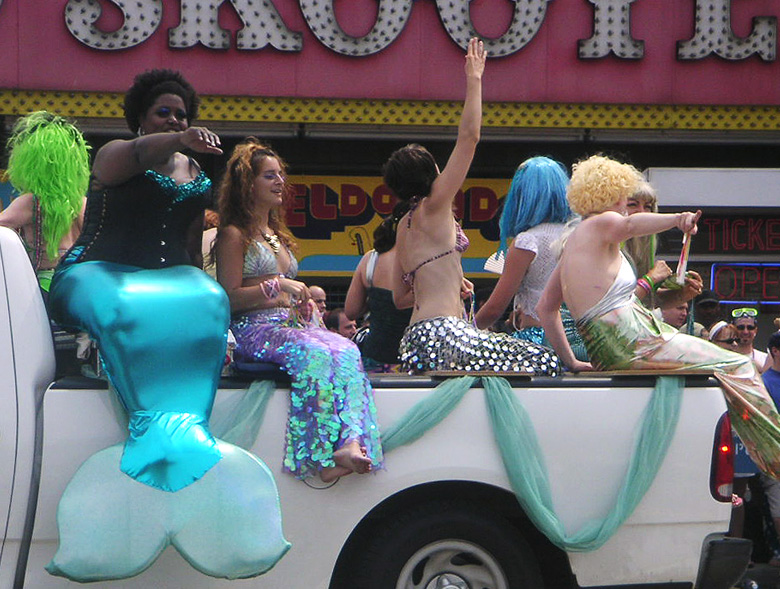
2004 Parade

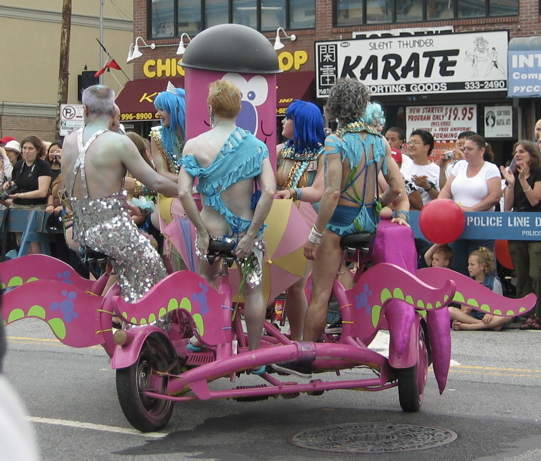
2006 Parade

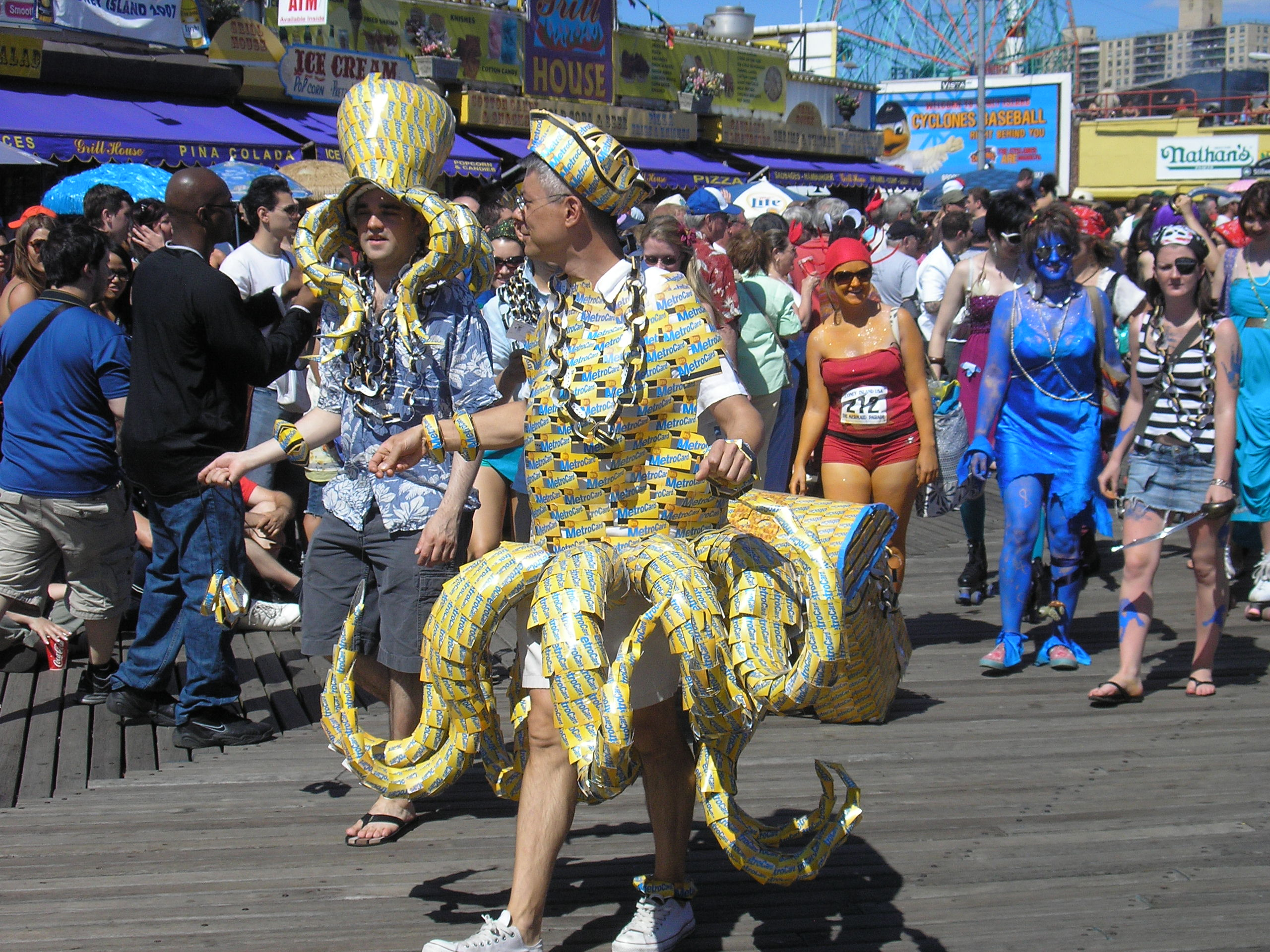
2007 Parade

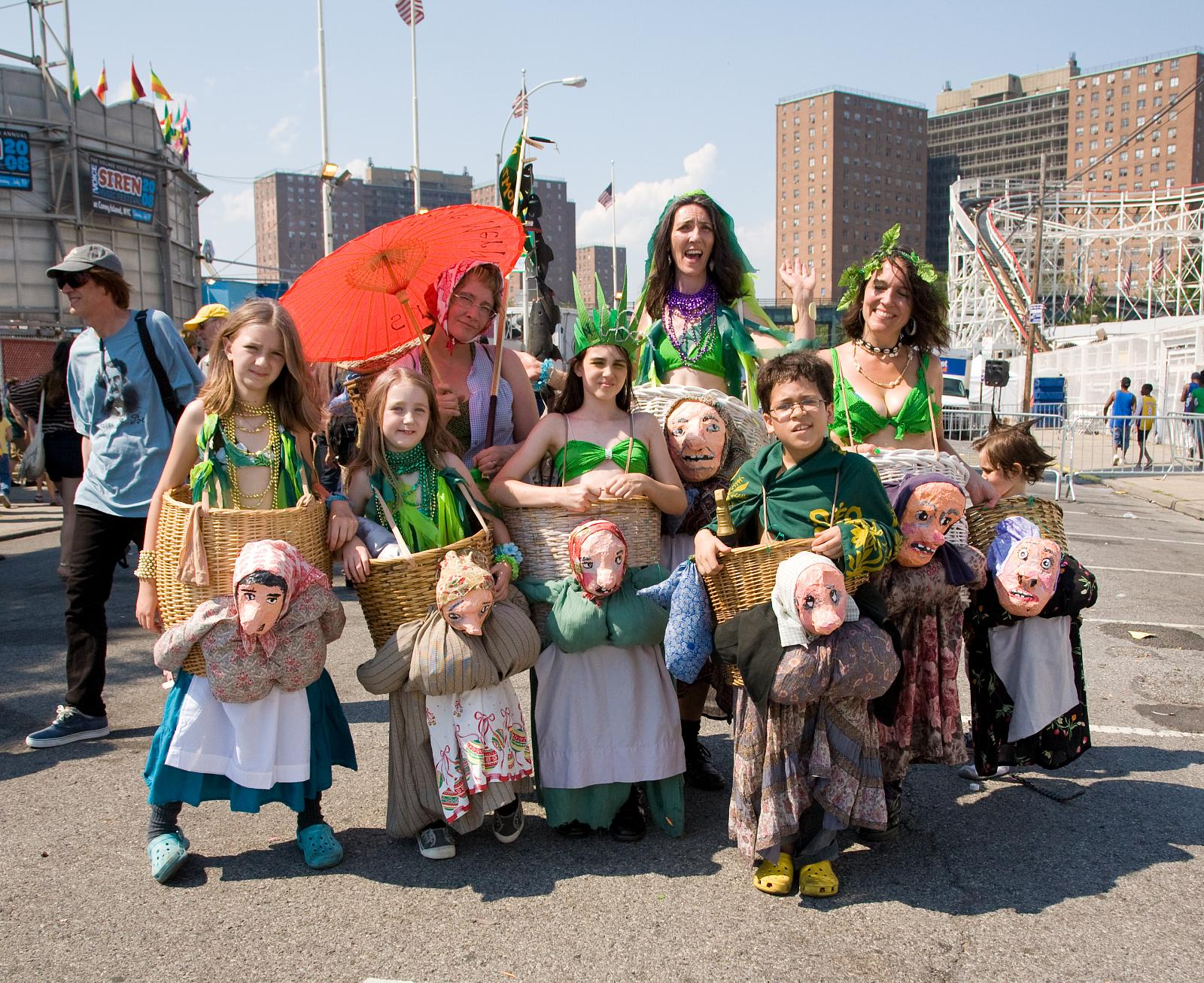
2008 Parade

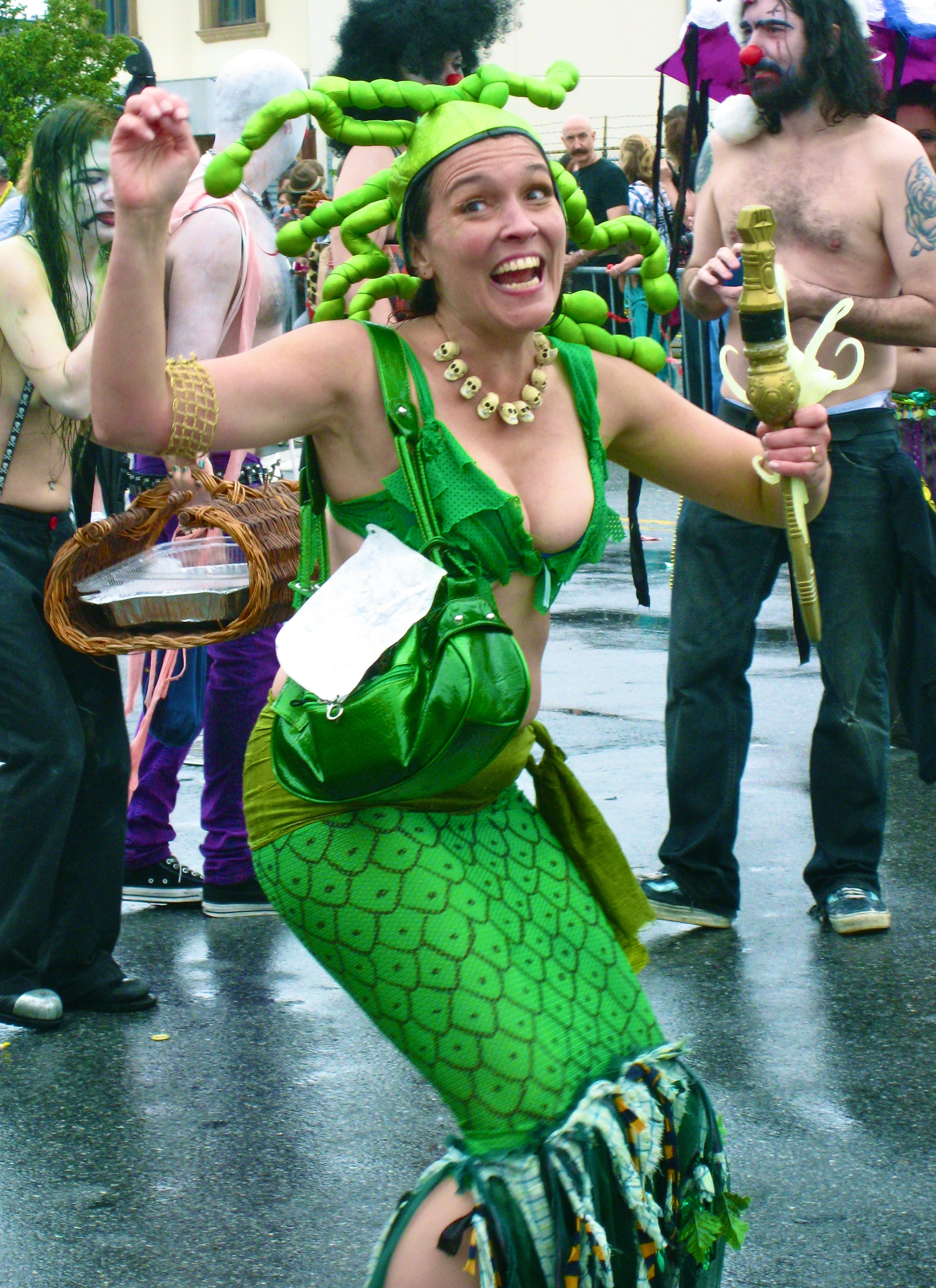
2009 Parade

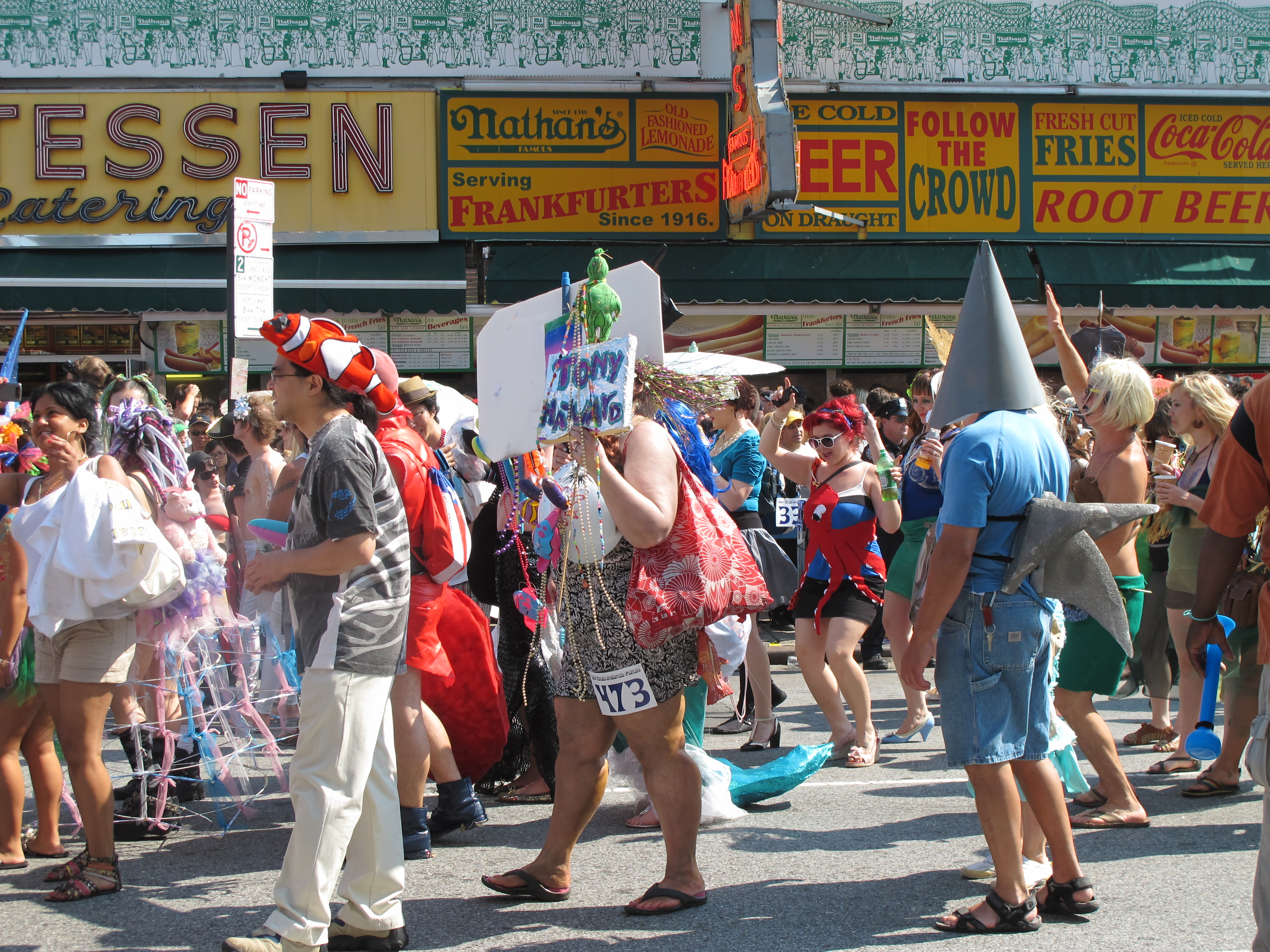
2010 Parade

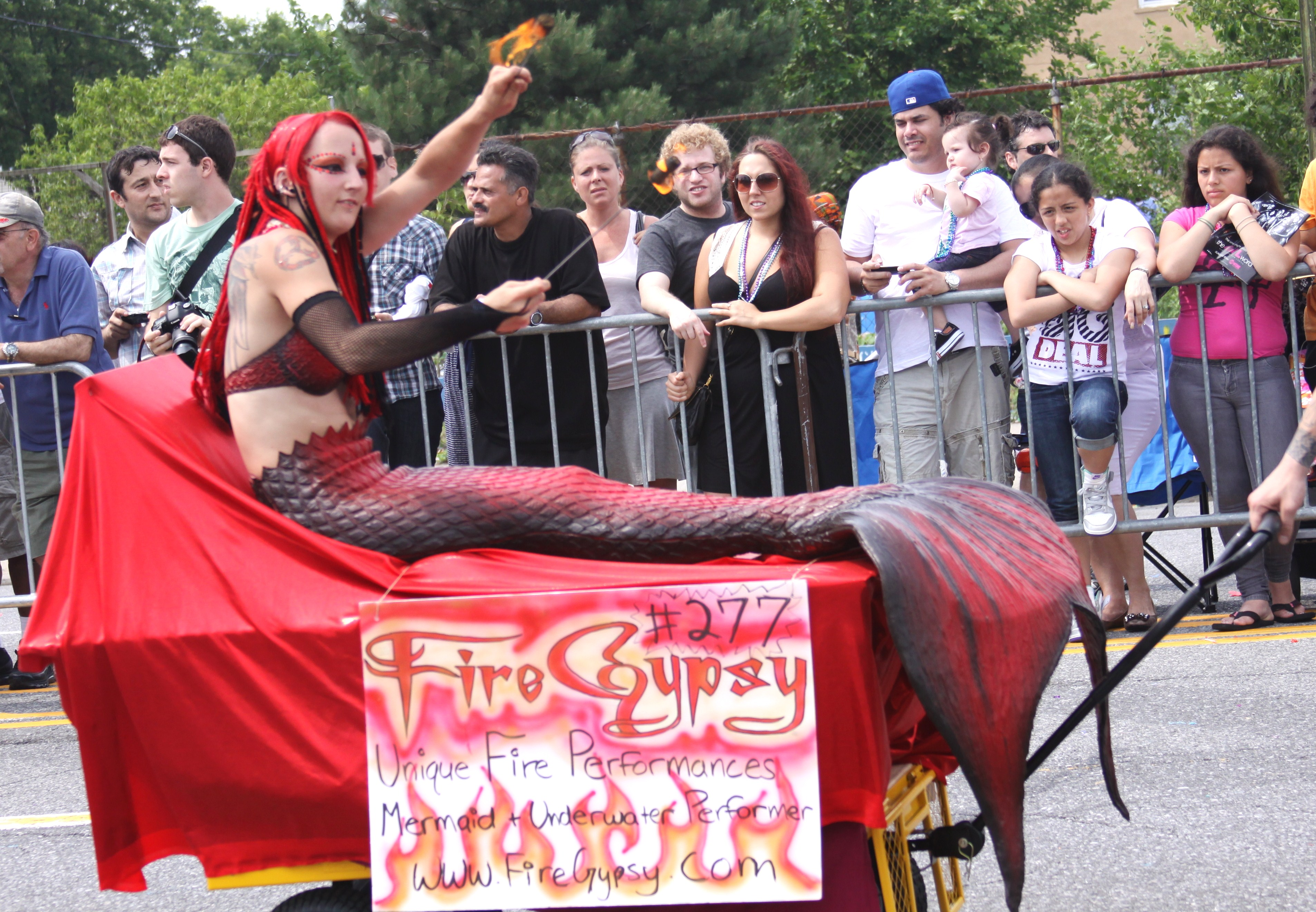
2011 Parade

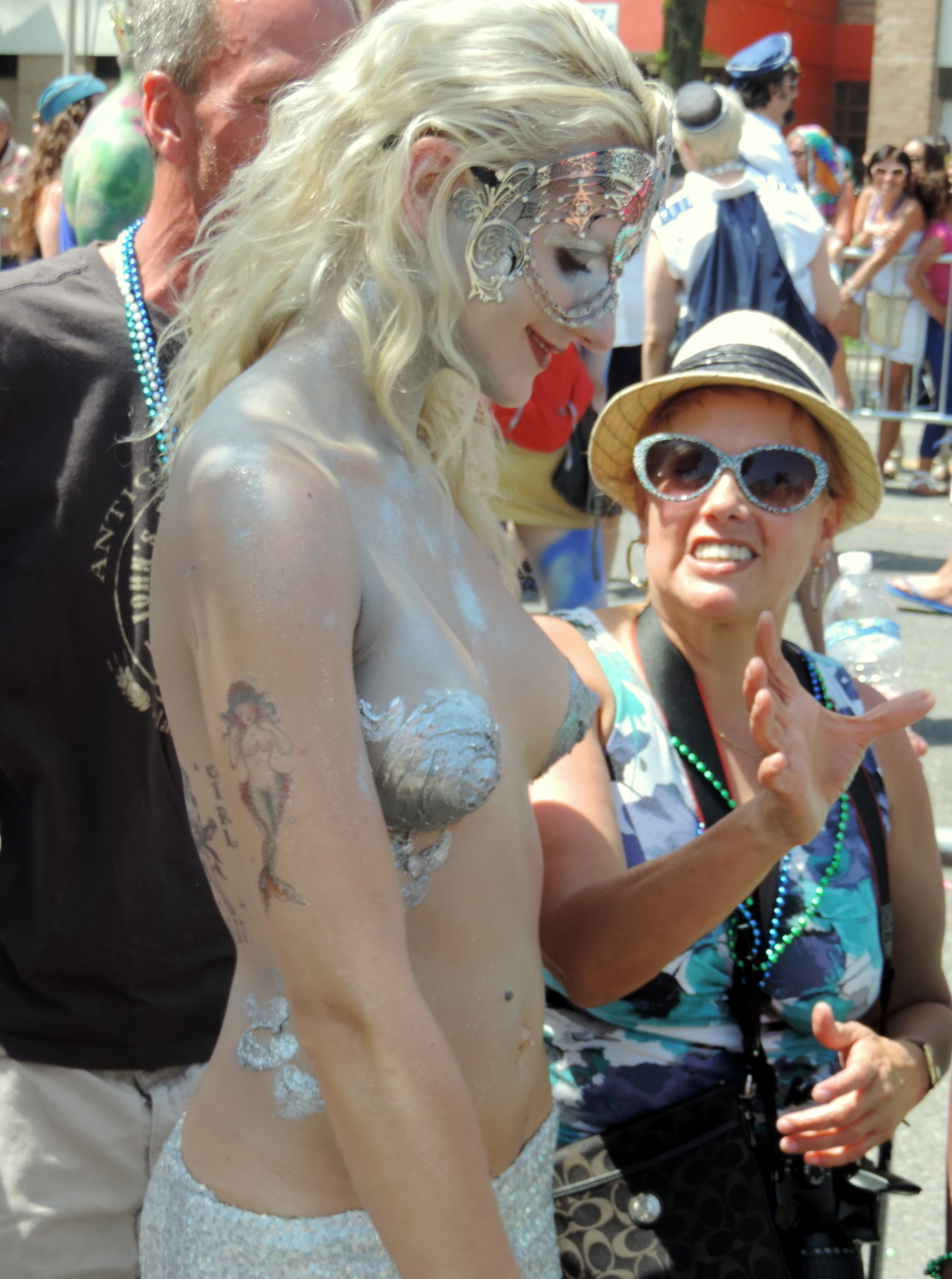
2014 Parade

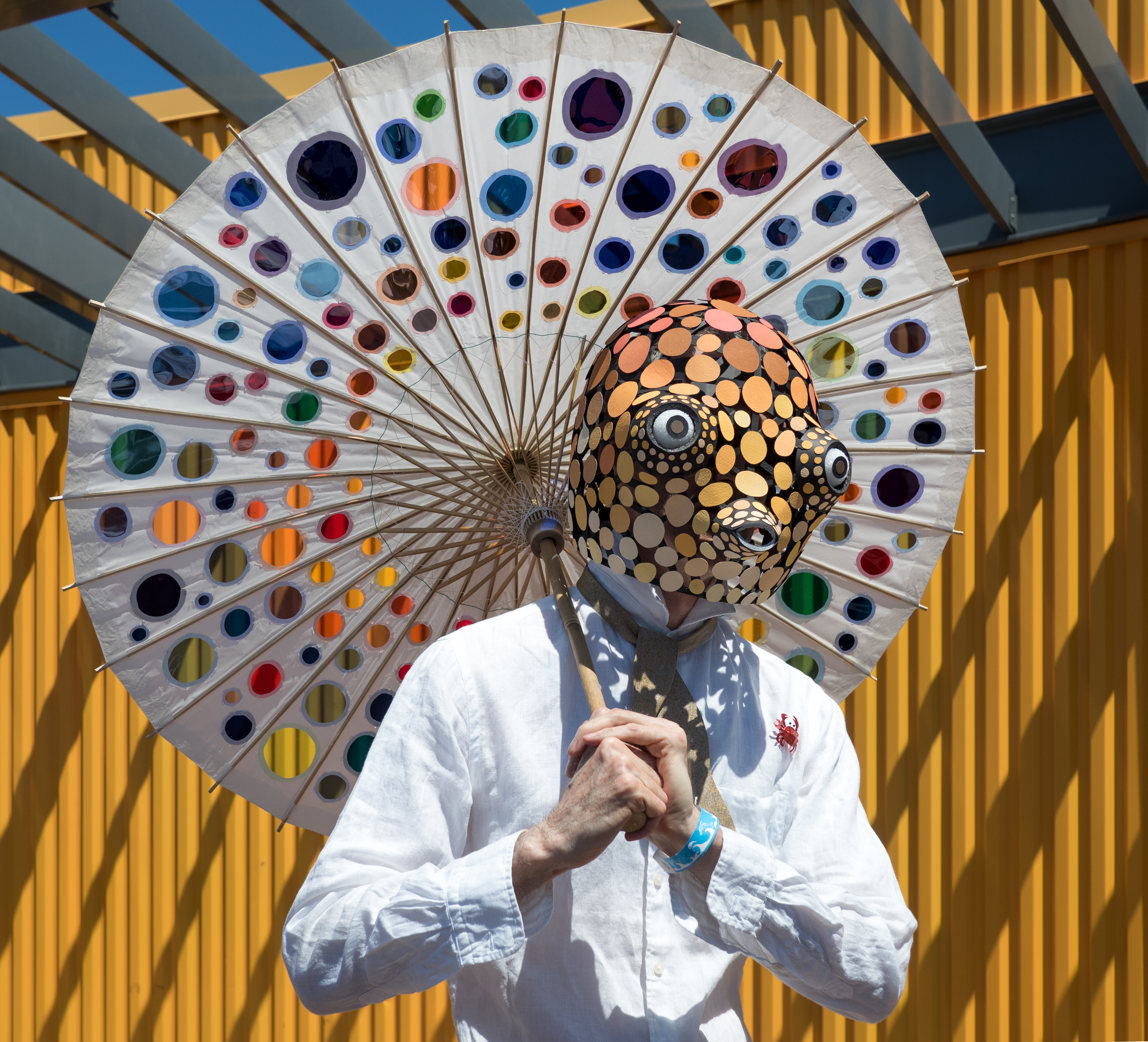
2018 Parade

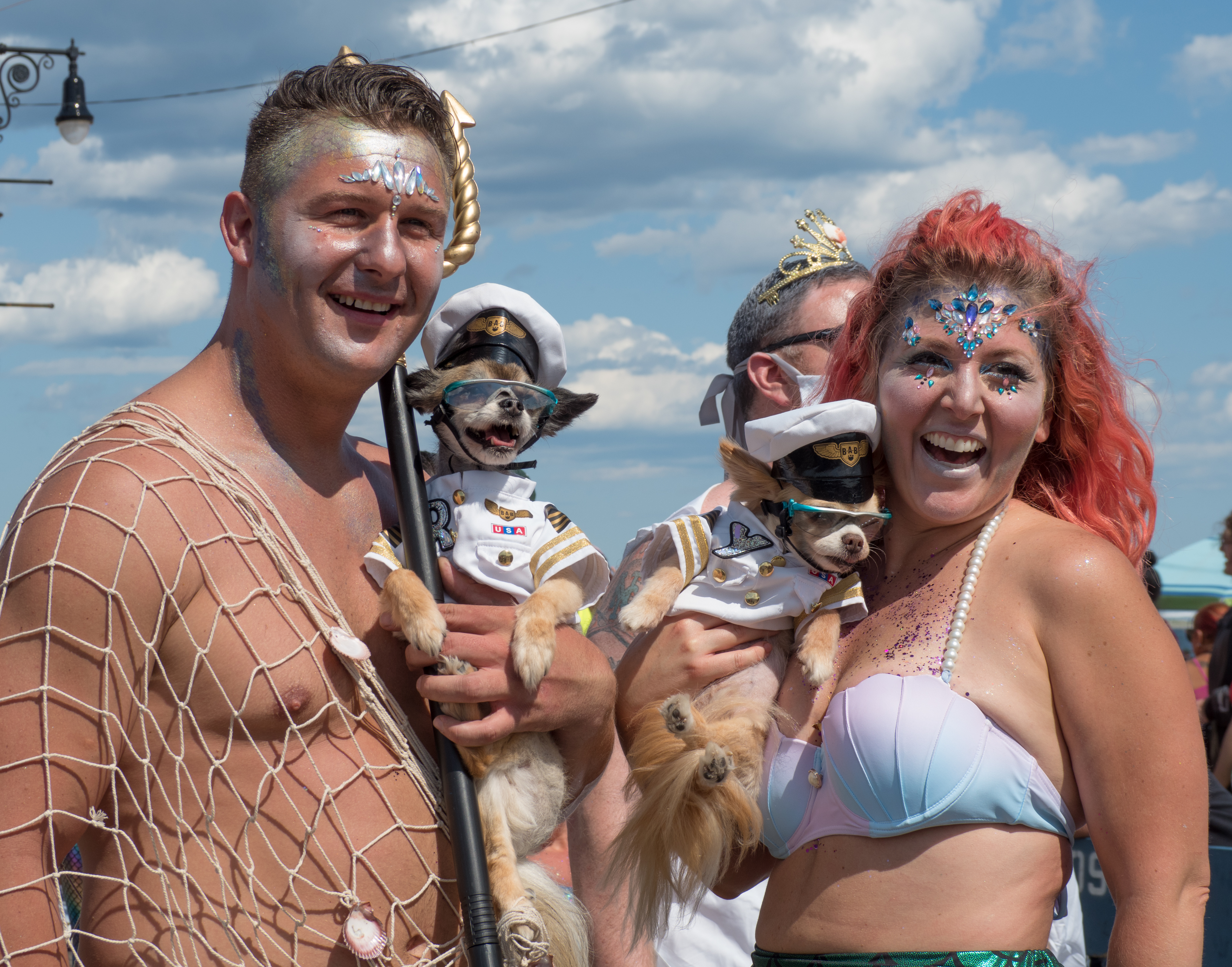
2019 Parade

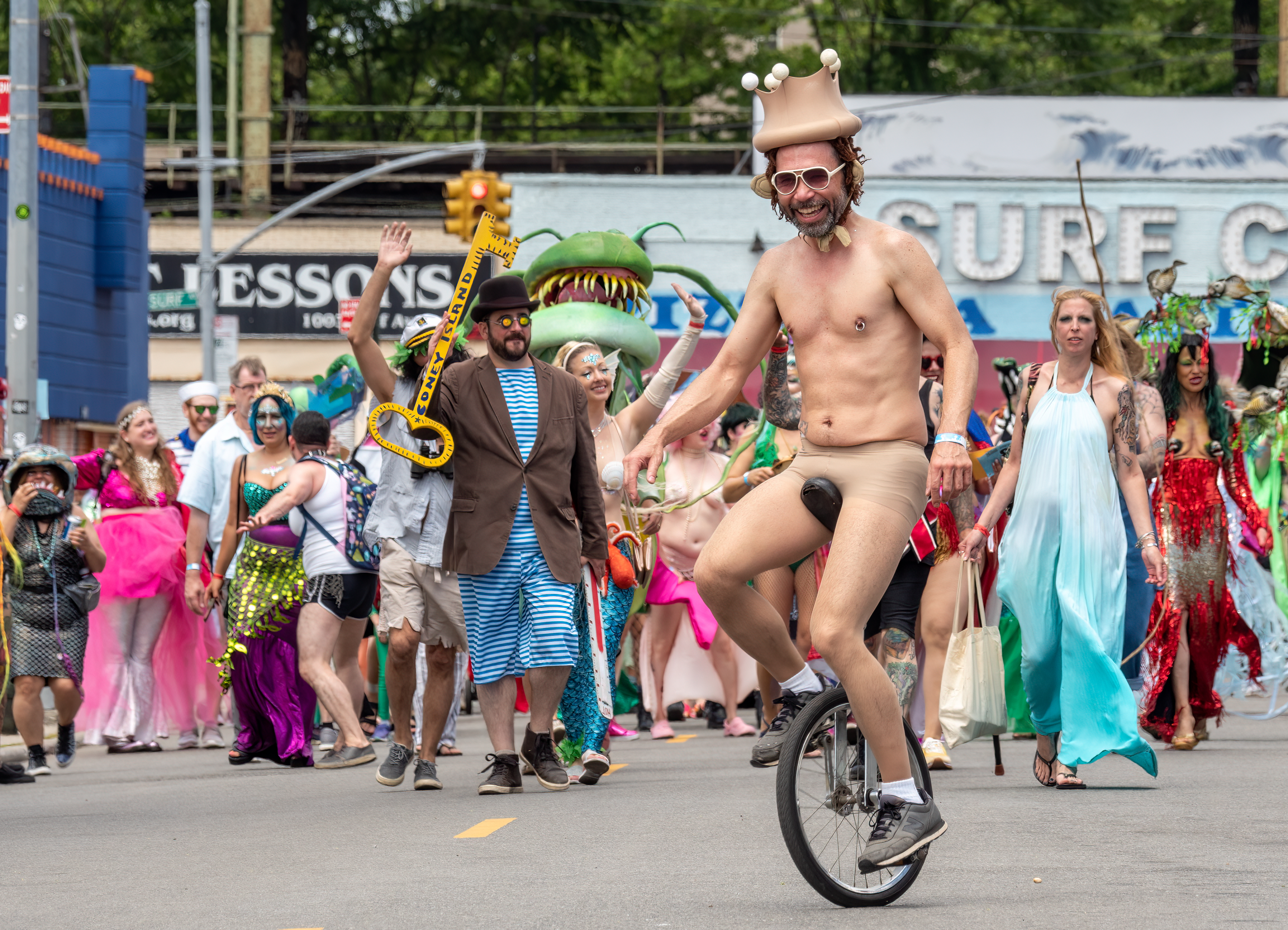
2022 Parade (2020 and 2021 canceled due to COVID 19)

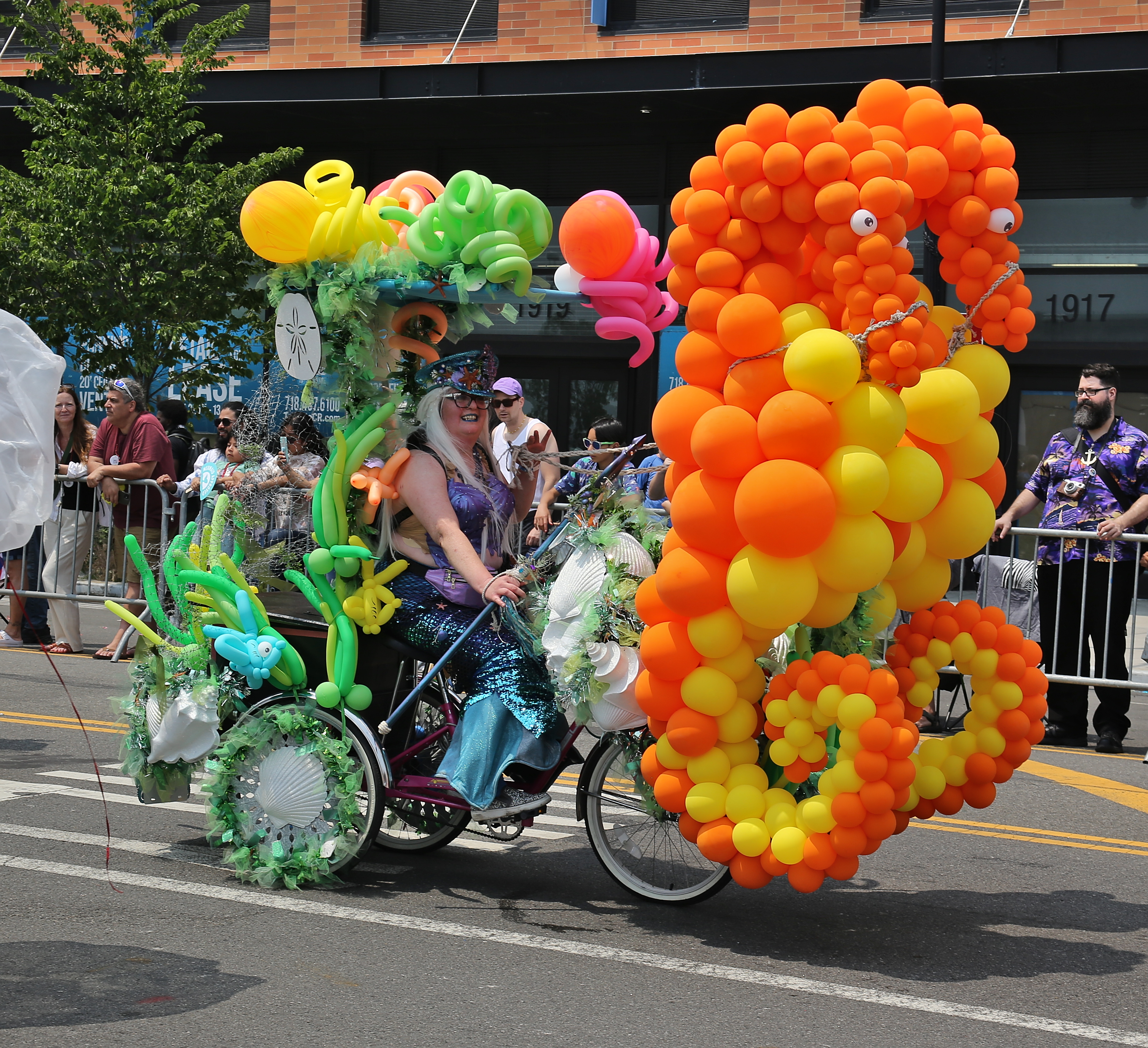
2023 Parade

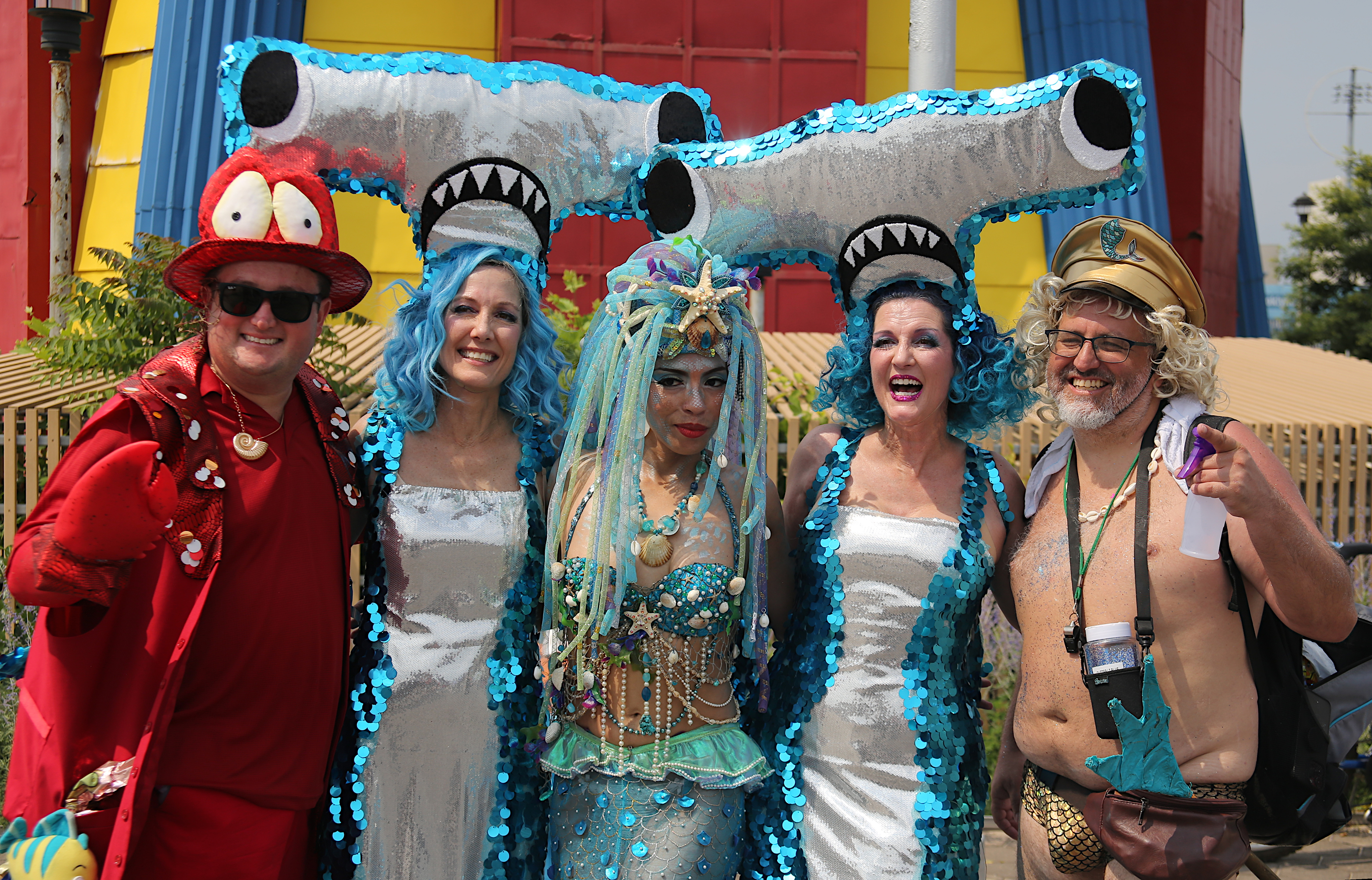
2024 Parade

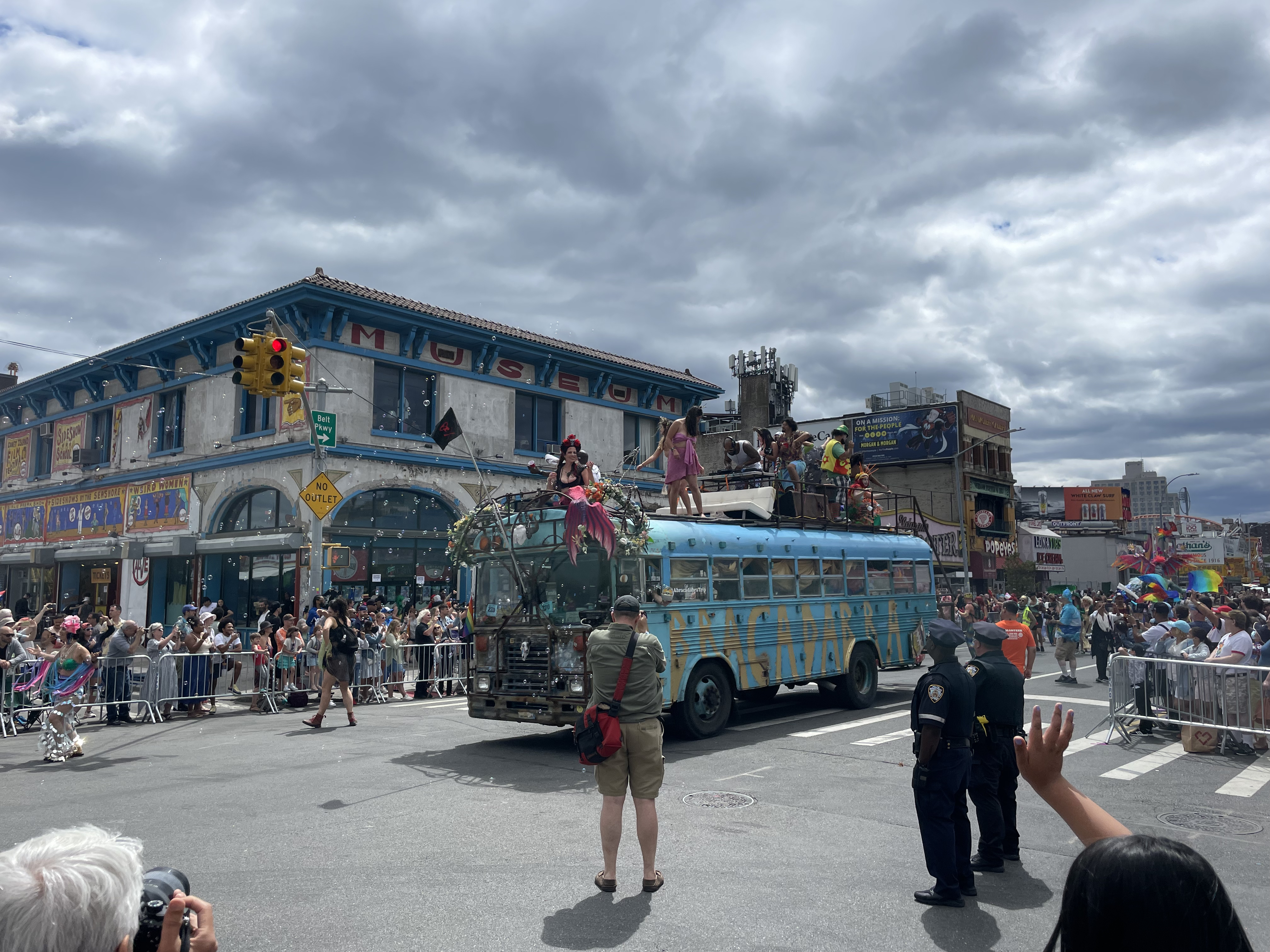

== See also ==
- Julián Is a Mermaid
