= IAd Producer =

Authoring tool by Apple

iAd Producer
- Developer: Apple Inc.
- Stable release: 5.2 (5432) / April 1, 2016
- Operating system: Mac OS X 10.8.4 "Mountain Lion" or later
- Type: Integrated Development Environment (IDE)
- License: Registerware
- Website: developer.apple.com/iad/iadproducer/

iAd Producer was introduced by Apple Inc. in 2010 as a new authoring tool for designing and developing interactive iAd using HTML5, CSS3, and JavaScript standards for distribution through its iAd network within iOS apps. iAd and by extension iAd Producer were both discontinued in June 2016.

== Version History ==
Since version 2.0, Apple has maintained an archive of iAd Producer release notes.

iAd Producer Version	Release date
5.2	Apr 1, 2016
5.1	Sep 21, 2015
5.0.2	Aug 14, 2015
5.0.1	Nov 11, 2014
5.0	Sep 19, 2014
4.2	May 22, 2014
4.1.2	Mar 10, 2014
4.1	Oct 3, 2013
4.0.2	Jul 17, 2013
4.0.1	Jun 20, 2013
4.0	Apr 24, 2013
3.3	Jan 17, 2013
3.2	Nov 1, 2012
3.1	Sep 27, 2012
3.0	Aug 8, 2012
2.1.1	Jun 16, 2012
2.1	Apr 4, 2012
2.0.3	Feb 22, 2012
2.0.2	Feb 13, 2012
2.0.1	Dec 15, 2011
2.0	Nov 8, 2011
1.2	Jun 23, 2011
1.1	Mar 9, 2011
1.0	Dec 20, 2010
