= Late Afternoon =

- Film poster
- Directed by: Louise Bagnall
- Written by: Louise Bagnall
- Produced by: Nuria González Blanco
- Edited by: Goran Kvrgig; Alan Slattery
- Music by: Colm Mac Con Iomaire
- Production company: Cartoon Saloon
- Release date: 15 July 2017 (Galway)
- Running time: 9 minutes
- Country: Ireland
- Language: English

Late Afternoon is an Irish animated short film directed by Louise Bagnall and produced by Cartoon Saloon.

== Summary ==
The film is about an elderly woman (voiced by Fionnula Flanagan) coping with dementia as she relives her memories of the past.

== Accolades ==
- Nominated for Academy Award for Best Animated Short Film
- IFTA Award for Best Animated Short Film
- Best Animated Short Film, Baku International Animation Festival

== See also ==
- Alzheimer's disease
- 2018 in film
- Cinema of Ireland
