= Glaxnimate =

2D vector animation software

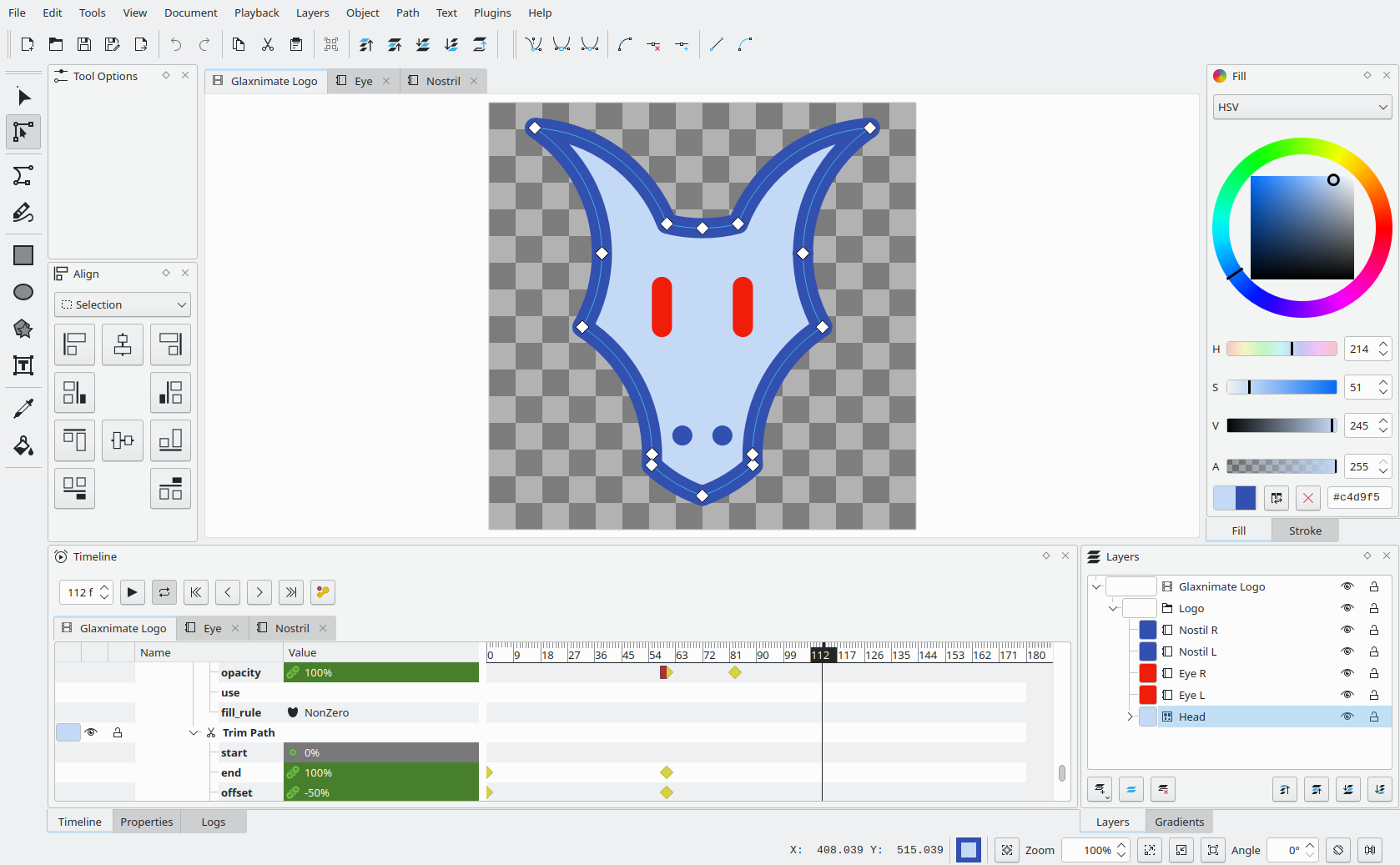
- Original author: Mattia "Glax" Basaglia
- Initial release: September 25, 2020; 5 years ago
- Stable release: 0.5.4 / 10 September 2023
- Repository: invent.kde.org/graphics/glaxnimate
- Written in: C++
- Operating system: Linux, macOS, Microsoft Windows, FreeBSD, Android
- Type: Vector graphics editor, computer animation
- License: GPL-3.0-or-later
- Website: glaxnimate.org

Glaxnimate is a free and open-source, cross-platform, 2D vector animation software.

It has been integrated into Shotcut and Kdenlive to add vector capabilities to video editors.

== Supported formats ==
Glaxnimate saves animations using a custom JSON-based format, but it also supports loading and saving animated SVG, Lottie, Android Vector Drawables, and After Effects Project files (.aep).

It can also render to video using FFmpeg, WebP, and GIF.

It can import and render to a variety of raster image formats.

== Features ==
=== Graphics ===
- Gradients
- Bézier curves
- Image tracing
- Masking
- Text

=== Animation ===
- Tweening
- Precompositions
- Animation along path
