= InfoQ =

Potential of a data set

Information quality (InfoQ) is the extent to which a data set can help achieve a specific scientific or practical goal when it is used with a particular empirical analysis method.

== Definition ==
InfoQ is often expressed as InfoQ = U(X,f|g), where X is the data, f is the analysis method, g is the goal, and U is the utility function. In simpler terms, it describes how useful a given set of data is for answering a particular question with a particular method. InfoQ is related to both data quality and analysis quality, but it is not the same as either one; it depends on the quality of the data, the suitability of the analysis, and how well the data, method, and goal fit together.

InfoQ has been applied in fields including healthcare, customer surveys, data science programmes, advanced manufacturing, and Bayesian network applications.

Kenett and Shmueli (2014) proposed eight dimensions to help assess InfoQ and various methods for increasing InfoQ: data resolution, data structure, data integration, temporal relevance, chronology of data and goal, generalization, operationalization, and communication.
