= FlipaClip =

Traditional animation software

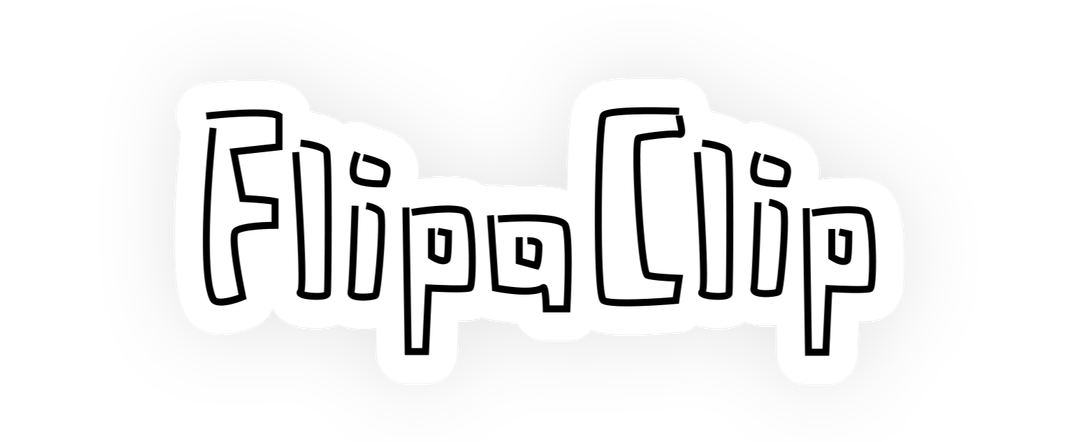
- Developer: Visual Blasters LLC
- Release: April 2, 2012; 14 years ago
- Operating system: Android, iOS, macOS, ChromeOS
- Available in: 15 languages
- Licence: EULA
- Website: flipaclip.com

FlipaClip is a traditional animation software application. FlipaClip was mainly developed by the three Meson brothers of Miami-based company Visual Blasters LLC. It was initially made available for Android in 2012 before being released for iOS, macOS and ChromeOS. FlipaClip has an online community of mainly young creators.

== Features ==
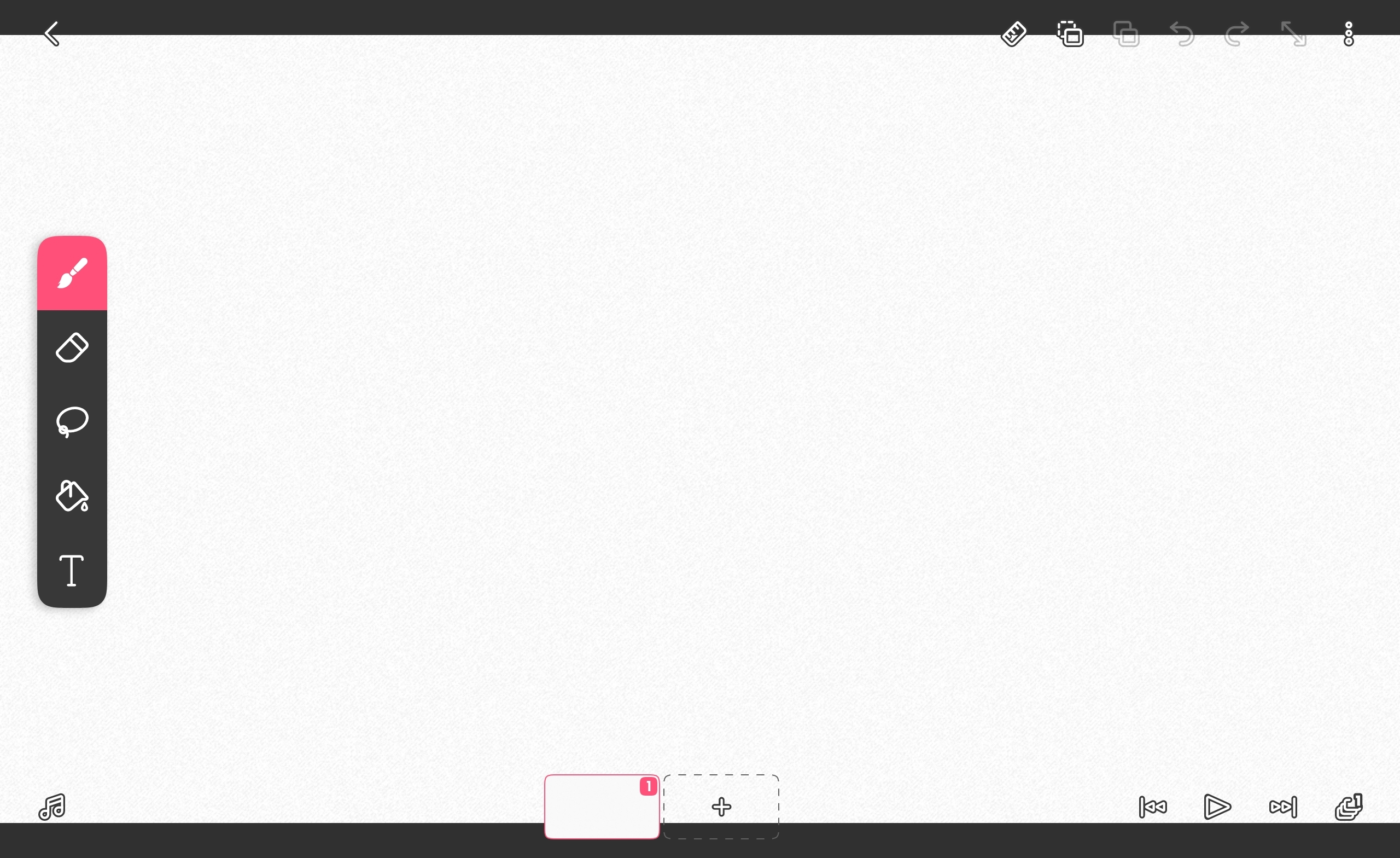
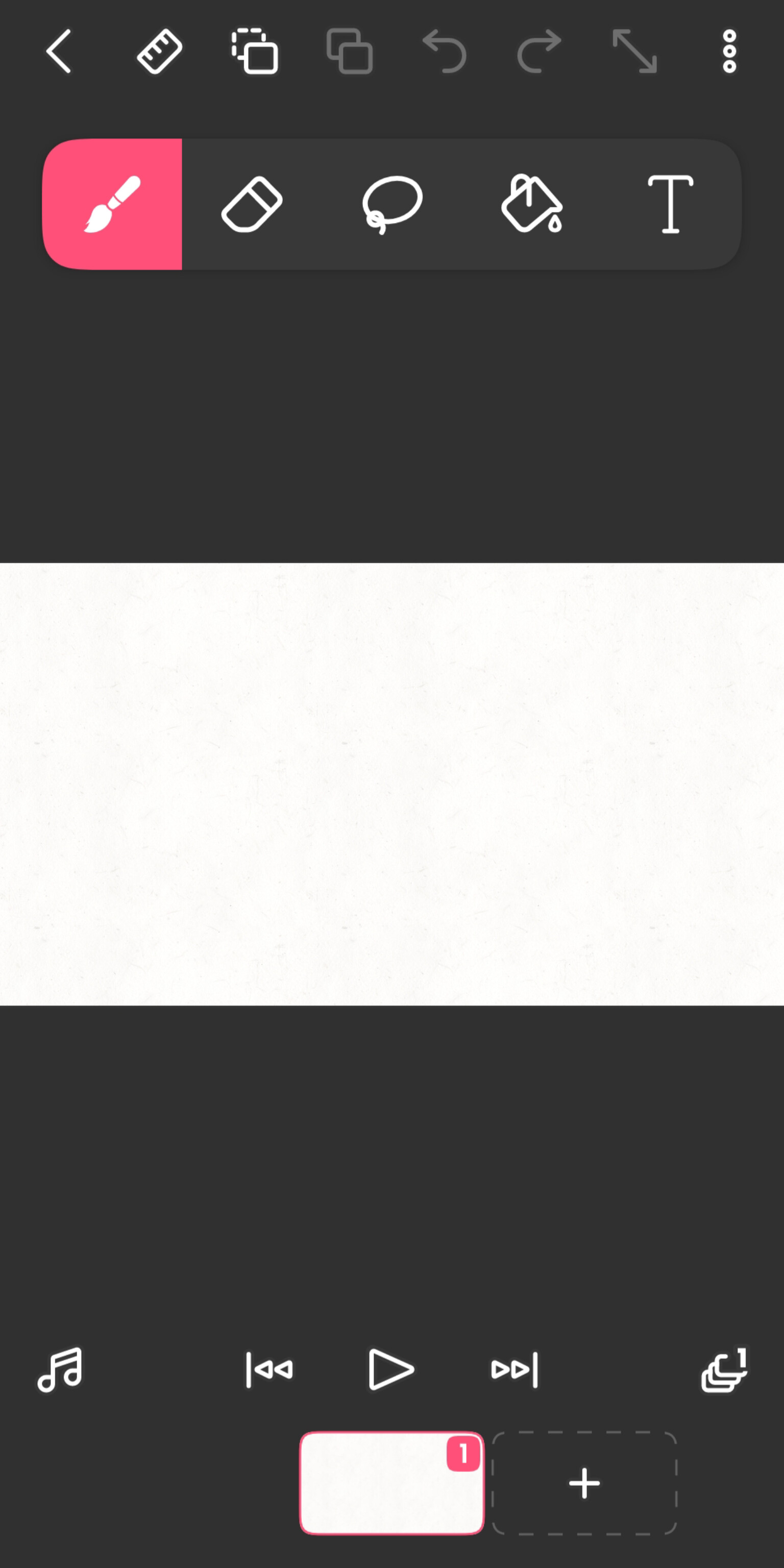
Basic layout on a horizontal tablet (left) and a vertical phone (right) with a blank project. (c. February 2024)

FlipaClip allows users to create frame-by-frame traditional animations. Besides the basic drawing features, users can use a customizable rule tool; import images, videos and audio files; create multiple frame layers at various frames per second; and export their work in various file formats.

The software has a free and a paid subscription version (FlipaClip Plus) with more features.

== History ==
FlipaClip was developed by Visual Blasters LLC, a Miami-based mobile app company founded in 2010 by Argentinian-born brothers Jonathan and Marcos Meson. The brothers have prior experience in software engineering, marketing, internet radio and motion graphics design. In 2012, their youngest brother Tim joined the company as a lead engineer. (Note: By 2022, the Visual Blasters team had reached 16 employees.)

The idea for FlipaClip was inspired by the Meson brothers' previous animation software creations and concepts going back to 2008, prior to the company's founding. The project began in earnest in 2012 with a submission to a contest with a one-month deadline hosted by Samsung for stylus-based apps. Jonathan and Tim worked on technical aspects like coding, while Marcos dealt with the visual design.

While the brothers did not win the contest, the app launched on Android in April 2012 and was further developed thereafter. Visual Blasters made a deal with children's tablet computer company Fuhu in 2014, which resulted in FlipaClip being pre-installed in over 400,000 devices. In March 2017, the app was made available for iOS; it was also eventually released for macOS, ChromeOS and Huawei devices.

In November 2024, 900 thousand users were exposed in a data breach due to an exposed Firebase server. The app's team stated that they subsequently solved the issue.

== Community ==
Web animation video made with FlipaClip

In February 2017, the Android app attained 5.5 million downloads, and 550,000 users were reported to be monthly active. During the COVID-19 pandemic starting in 2020, the number of monthly active FlipaClip users doubled, which the Miami Herald partially attributed to its use by teachers. (Note: The app's gross revenue during the pandemic's early stages saw a growth of over 100%.) By 2022, FlipaClip had been downloaded 60 million times and reached 6 million monthly active users.

The app formed an active community of creators, many of which share their animations on social media platforms such as YouTube and TikTok. 70% of its users were reportedly under 18 by 2022, which, according to Miami Inno of The Business Journals, indicates traction among members of Generation Z. As part of one of the app's sponsored contests, "Beat COVID-19", 300,000 creators animated educational videos about the virus.

== Reception ==
In her review for Common Sense Media, Ana Beltran rated the app 4 stars out of 5. She mentioned how the app's introductory tutorial encouraged new and experienced creators, and despite the "somewhat distracting" advertisements in the free version, the interface and navigation were nonetheless regarded as "inviting" and promoting creativity in children.

In 2019, Apple nominated FlipaClip for the App Trend of the Year distinction. FlipaClip was awarded "Best for Chromebooks" in Google Play's Best of 2023.
