= Onion skinning =

2D animation technique

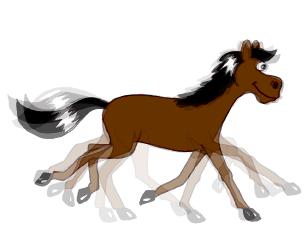
Onion skin of frame 7 of an animation of a running horse also showing the previous three frames

Onion skinning is an animation technique that allows an artist or editor to view multiple frames at once. Originally used in traditional hand-drawn animation with translucent paper to compare adjacent drawings, it was later adopted in 2D computer animation software to help animators create smooth and consistent motion across frames.

== History ==
In traditional animation, the individual frames of a film were initially drawn on thin onionskin paper over a light source. The animators (mostly inbetweeners) would put the previous and next drawings exactly beneath the working drawing, so that they could draw the 'in between' to give a smooth motion.

In modern computer software, this effect is achieved by making frames translucent and projecting them on top of each other.

== Other uses ==
This effect can also be used to create motion blur, as seen in The Matrix when characters dodge bullets.

== See also ==
- Anime Studio
- Adobe Flash
- TVPaint
- 3ds max
