= Mobile High-Definition Link =

Audio and video interface

Mobile High-Definition Link (MHL)
- Type: Digital audio/video/data connector

Production history
- Designer: MHL Consortium: Nokia; Samsung; Silicon Image; Sony; Toshiba
- Designed: June 2010; 16 years ago

General specifications
- Hot pluggable: Yes
- External: Yes
- Pins: MHL 1, 2, & 3 (5), superMHL (5/24/32)

Mobile High-Definition Link (MHL) is an industry standard for a mobile audio/video interface that allows the connection of smartphones, tablets, and other portable consumer electronics devices to high-definition televisions (HDTVs), audio receivers, and projectors. The standard was designed to share existing mobile device connectors, such as Micro-USB, and avoid the need to add video connectors on devices with limited space for them.

MHL connects to display devices either directly through special HDMI inputs that are MHL-enabled, or indirectly through standard HDMI inputs using MHL-to-HDMI adapters. MHL was developed by a consortium of five companies: Nokia, Samsung, Silicon Image, Sony and Toshiba.

== History ==
Silicon Image, one of the founding companies of the HDMI standard, originally demonstrated a mobile interconnect at the January 2008 Consumer Electronics Show (CES), based on its transition-minimized differential signaling (TMDS) technology. This interface was termed "Mobile High Definition Link" at the time of the demonstration, and is a direct precursor of the implementation announced by the MHL Consortium. The company is quoted as saying it did not ship that original technology in any volume, but used it as a way to get a working group started.

The working group was announced in September 2009, and the MHL Consortium founded in April 2010 by Nokia, Samsung, Silicon Image, Sony and Toshiba. The MHL specification version 1.0 was released in June 2010, and the Compliance Test Specification (CTS) was released in December 2010. May 2011 marked the first retail availability of MHL-enabled products.

The first mobile device to feature the MHL standard was the Samsung Galaxy S II, announced at the 2011 Mobile World Congress. MHL announced in 2014 that more than half a billion MHL-capable products had been shipped since the standard was created.

== Overview ==
Pin assignments for Micro-USB to MHL-enabled HDMI. The MHL TMDS data lane (purple & green) uses the differential pair present in both USB 2.0 (Data− & Data+) and HDMI (TMDS Data0− & Data0+). The MHL Control Bus repurposes the USB On-The-Go ID (pin 4), and the HDMI Hot Plug Detect (pin 19), while the pins for power & ground match their original assignment for both.

MHL is an adaptation of HDMI intended for mobile devices such as smartphones and tablets. Unlike DVI, which is compatible with HDMI using only passive cables and adapters, MHL requires that the HDMI socket be MHL-enabled. (To deliver an MHL signal to a non-MHL HDMI socket, one can use an adapter device that receives the signal on an MHL-enabled socket, converts it to HDMI, and transmits the HDMI signal to the non-MHL socket). It has several aspects in common with HDMI, such as the ability to carry uncompressed HDCP encrypted high-definition video, eight-channel surround sound, and control remote devices with Consumer Electronics Control (CEC).

There are a total of five pins used in MHL rather than the 19 used in HDMI, namely: a differential pair for data, a bi-directional control channel (CBUS), power charging supply, and ground. This permits a much lighter cable and a much smaller connector on the mobile device, as a typical MHL source will be shared with USB 2.0 on a standard 5-pin Micro-USB receptacle. (Although MHL ports can be dedicated to MHL alone, the standard is designed to permit port sharing with the most commonly used ports.) The USB port switches from USB to MHL when it recognizes an MHL-qualified sink (e.g., a TV) detected on the control wire. A typical MHL sink will be shared with HDMI on a standard 19-pin HDMI receptacle.

Because the same five-pin Micro-USB port is also typically used for charging the device, the sink is required to provide power to maintain the state of charge (or even recharge) while it is being used (although this is dependent on the power available being sufficient e.g., MHL 2 & 3 provide a minimum of 4.5 W / 900 mA, while superMHL can provide up to 40 W). The use of the power line in this way differs from HDMI, which expects the source to provide 55 mA for the purpose of reading the EDID of a display.

Because of to the low pin count of MHL versus HDMI, the functions that are carried on separate dedicated pins on HDMI, namely: the Display Data Channel (DDC) (pins 15 & 16) and CEC (pin 13) are instead carried on the bi-directional control bus (CBUS). The CBUS both emulates the function of the DDC bus and also carries an MHL sideband channel (MSC), which emulates the CEC bus function, and allows a TV remote to control the media player on a phone with its Remote Control Protocol (RCP).

=== Bandwidth ===
MHL uses the same Transition-minimized differential signaling (TMDS) as HDMI to carry video, audio, and auxiliary data. However, MHL differs from HDMI in that there is only one differential pair to carry the TMDS data lane, compared to HDMI's four (three data lanes, plus the clock). Therefore these three logical data channels are instead time-division multiplexed into the single physical MHL data lane (i.e., with the logical channels sent sequentially), and the clock signal carried as a common mode signal of this pair. From MHL 3 onwards, the method for carrying the clock signal changed to being carried separately on the MHL CBUS pin instead.

The normal (24 bit) mode operates at 2.25 Gbit/s, and multiplexes the same three channel, 24 bit color signal as HDMI, at a pixel clock rate of up to 75 MHz, sufficient for 1080i and 720p at 60 Hz. One period of the MHL clock equals one period of the pixel clock, and each period of the MHL clock transmits three 10-bit TMDS characters (i.e., a 24-bit pixel, where each 10-bit TMDS character represents an encoded byte – 8-bits).

MHL can also operate in PackedPixel mode at 3 Gbit/s, catering for 1080p, in this case only two channels are multiplexed, as the color signal is changed to a chroma subsampled (YCbCr 4:2:2) pair of adjacent 16-bit pixels (i.e., where two adjacent pixels share chroma values and are represented with only 36-bits), and the pixel clock is doubled to 150 MHz. In this mode, one clock period of the MHL clock now equals two periods of the pixel clock, so each period of the MHL clock transmits twice the number of channels i.e., four 10-bit TMDS characters (a pair of 16-bit pixels).

Version 3 of MHL changed from being frame-based to a packet-based technology, and operates at 6 Gbit/s. superMHL extends this by carrying the data signal over more than one differential pair (up to four with USB Type-C, or a total of six using a superMHL cable) allowing up to 36 Gbit/s.

== Versions ==
All MHL specifications are backward compatible to previous versions of the standard. MHL is connection agnostic (i.e., not tied to a specific type of hardware connector). The first implementations used the 5-pin MHL-USB connector described below, and all are supported over USB Type-C MHL Alternate Mode. Other proprietary and custom connections are also allowed.

=== MHL 1 ===
Version 1.0 was introduced in June 2010, supporting uncompressed HD video up to 720p/1080i 60 Hz (with RGB and YCbCr 4:2:2/4:4:4 pixel encoding). Support for 1080p 60 Hz (YCbCr 4:2:2) was introduced in version 1.3. The specification supports standard SD (Rec. 601) and HD (Rec. 709) color spaces, as well as those introduced in HDMI 1.3 and 1.4 (xvYCC, sYCC601, Adobe RGB, and AdobeYCC601). Other features include 192 kHz 24-bit LPCM 8-channel surround sound audio, HDCP 1.4 content protection, and a minimum of 2.5 W (500 mA) power between sink (e.g., TV) and source (e.g., mobile phone) for charging. The MHL sideband channel (MSC) includes a built-in Remote Control Protocol (RCP) function allowing the remote control of the TV to operate the MHL mobile device through TV's Consumer Electronics Control (CEC) function, or allowing a mobile device to manage the playback of its content on the TV.

=== MHL 2 ===
Version 2.0 was introduced in April 2012, and raised the minimum charging supply to 4.5 W (900 mA), with an optional 7.5 W (1.5 A) maximum allowed. Support for 3D video was also introduced, permitting 720p/1080i 60 Hz, and 1080p 24 Hz 3D video modes. The specification also included additional MHL sideband channel (MSC) commands.

=== MHL 3 ===
Version 3.0 was introduced in August 2013, and added support for 4K Ultra HD (3840 × 2160) 30 Hz video, increasing the maximum bandwidth from 3 Gbit/s to 6 Gbit/s. An additional YCbCr 4:2:0 pixel encoding for 4K resolution was also introduced, while the maximum charging supply was increased to 10 W (2 A). Support for compressed lossless audio formats was added with support for Dolby TrueHD and DTS-HD Master Audio.

The specification increased the speed of the bi-directional data channel from 1 Mbit/s to 75 Mbit/s to enable concurrent 4K video and human interface device (HID) support, such as mice, keyboards, touchscreens, and game controllers. Other features include support for simultaneous multiple displays, improved Remote Control Protocol (RCP) with new commands, and HDCP 2.2 content protection.

=== superMHL ===
superMHL 1.0 was introduced in January 2015, supporting 8K Ultra HD (7680 × 4320) 120 Hz High Dynamic Range (HDR) video with wide color gamut (Rec. 2020) and 48-bit deep color. Support for object-based audio formats were added, such as Dolby Atmos and DTS:X, with an audio-only mode also available. The Remote Control Protocol (RCP) was also extended to link multiple MHL devices together (e.g., TV, AVR, Blu-ray Disc player) and control them via one remote.

The specification introduces a reversible 32-pin superMHL connector, which (along with USB Type-C) supports a higher charging power of up to 40 W (20 V / 2 A), and is designed for future bandwidth expansion. The increase in bandwidth over previous MHL versions is achieved by using multiple A/V lanes, each operating at 6 Gbit/s, with a maximum of six A/V lanes supported depending on device and connector type. For example, Micro-USB and HDMI Type-A support one A/V lane, USB Type-C supports up to four A/V lanes, and the superMHL connector supports up to six A/V lanes (36 Gbit/s).

In addition to supporting a variable number of lanes, the specification supports VESA Display Stream Compression (DSC) 1.1, a "visually lossless" (but mathematically lossy) video compression standard. In cases when the bandwidth of the available lane(s) is unable to meet the rate of the uncompressed video stream, bandwidth savings of up to 3:1 can be achieved with a DSC compression rate of 3.0×. For example, 4K 60 Hz is possible using a single lane (e.g., Micro-USB / HDMI Type-A) with a DSC rate of 3.0×.

superMHL can use a variety of source and sink connectors with certain limitations: micro-USB or proprietary connectors can be used for the source only, HDMI Type-A for the sink only, while the USB Type-C and the superMHL connectors can be used for the source or sink.

== Connectors ==
=== Micro-USB–to–HDMI (five-pin) ===
The first implementations used the most common connection for non-Apple mobile phones at the time, (Micro-USB), and the most common TV connection (HDMI). There are two types of connection, depending on whether the display device directly supports MHL.

==== Passive cable ====
Passive cables allow MHL devices to connect directly to MHL-enabled TVs (i.e. display devices or AV receivers with an MHL-enabled HDMI port) while providing charging power upstream to the mobile device. Other than the physical connectors, no USB or HDMI technology is being used. Exclusively MHL signaling is used through the connectors and over the cable.

==== Active adapter ====
With an active adapter, MHL devices are able to connect to HDMI display devices that do not have MHL capability by actively converting the signal to HDMI. These adapters often feature an additional Micro-USB port on them to provide charging power to the mobile device because standard HDMI ports do not supply sufficient current.

=== Samsung Micro-USB–to–HDMI adapter and tip (eleven-pin) ===
The Samsung Galaxy S III, and later Galaxy Note II and Galaxy S4, use an 11-pin connector and the six additional connector pins in order to achieve functional improvements over the 5-pin design (like simultaneous USB-OTG use). However, if consumers have a standard MHL-to-HDMI adapter all they need to purchase is a tip. With the launch of the Samsung Galaxy S4, Samsung also released MHL 2.0 smart adapter with a built-in 11-pin connector. The first Samsung MHL 1.0 smart adapter released with the Galaxy S III requires external power and is able to work with HDMI TVs at 1080p at 24 Hz. The MHL 2.0 adapter released with the Galaxy S4 can output 1080p at 60 Hz and does not need external power.

=== USB Type-C (MHL Alternate Mode) ===
The MHL Alternate Mode for USB 3.1 specification allows MHL-enabled source and display devices to be connected through a USB Type-C port. The standard was released on November 17, 2014, and is backward compatible with existing MHL specifications: supporting MHL 1, 2, 3 and superMHL. The standard supports the simultaneous transfer of data (at least USB 2.0, and depending on video resolution: USB 3.1 Gen 1 or 2) and power (up to 40 W via USB Power Delivery), in addition to MHL audio/video. This allows the connection to be used with mobile docks, allowing devices to connect to other peripherals while charging. The use of passive cables is possible when both devices support the standard, e.g., when connecting to superMHL, USB Type-C, and MHL-enabled HDMI, otherwise, an active cable adapter is necessary to connect to standard HDMI devices.

Depending on the bandwidth requirement, the standard makes use of a variable number of USB Type-C's four SuperSpeed differential pairs to carry each TMDS lane: A single lane is required for resolutions up to 4K/60 Hz, two lanes for 4K/120 Hz, and all four lanes for 8K/60 Hz. The MHL eCBUS signal is sent over a side-band (SBU) pin on the USB Type-C connector. When one or two lanes are used, USB 3.1 data transfer is supported.

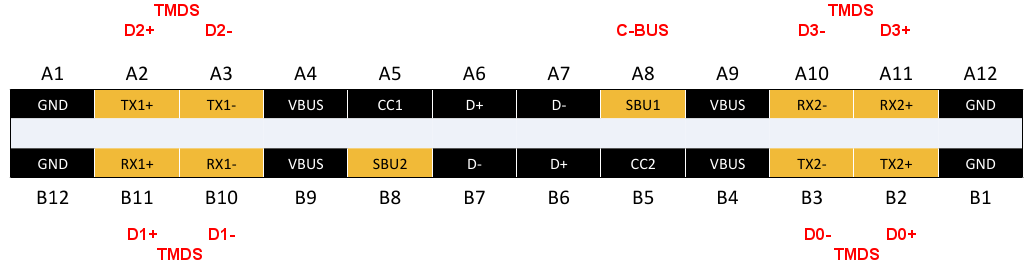
Pin mapping of the USB Type-C Alternate Mode for MHL

In common MHL Alternate Mode implementations, the video from the GPU will be converted to an MHL signal by using an MHL transmitter chip. The transmitter chips often accept video in MIPI (DSI/DPI) or HDMI format and convert it to MHL format. The USB Type-C port controller functions as a switch and multiplexer, passing the MHL signal through to the external devices. The dock or display device may use an MHL bridge chip to convert the MHL signal to HDMI signal format.

=== superMHL (32-pin) ===
In conjunction with the release of the superMHL specification in January 2015, MHL introduced a reversible 32-pin superMHL connector. The connector can carry six A/V lanes over six differential pairs, catering for the full 36 Gbit/s bandwidth available from the superMHL standard. The connector also enables 40 W of power at a higher voltage and current.

== Alternatives ==
SlimPort is a proprietary alternative to MHL, based on the DisplayPort standard integrated into common Micro-USB ports, and supports up to 1080p60, or 1080p30 with 3D content, over HDMI 1.4 (up to 5.4 Gbit/s of bandwidth), in addition to support for DVI, VGA (up to 1920 × 1080 at 60 Hz), and DisplayPort.

== See also ==
- AirPlay (proprietary, IP-based)
- Chromecast (proprietary media over IP: Google Cast for audio or audiovisual playback)
- Digital Living Network Alliance (DLNA) (IP-based)
- Miracast (wireless display technology)
- WiDi versions 3.5 to 6.0 support Miracast; discontinued
- Wireless HDMI
- WirelessHD (proprietary)
- Wireless Home Digital Interface
