= WirelessHD =

WirelessHD, also known as UltraGig, is a proprietary standard owned by Silicon Image (originally SiBeam) for Wireless transmission of high-definition video content for consumer electronics products. The consortium currently has over 40 adopters; key members behind the specification include Broadcom, Intel, LG, Panasonic, NEC, Samsung, SiBEAM, Sony, Philips and Toshiba. The founders intend the technology to be used for Consumer Electronic devices, PCs, and portable devices.

The specification was finalized in January 2008.

== Technology ==
The WirelessHD specification is based on a 7 GHz channel in the 60 GHz Extremely High Frequency radio band. It allows either lightly compressed (proprietary wireless link-aware codec) or uncompressed digital transmission of high-definition video and audio and data signals, essentially making it equivalent of a wireless HDMI. First-generation implementation achieves data rates from 4 Gbit/s, but the core technology allows theoretical data rates as high as 25 Gbit/s (compared to 10.2 Gbit/s for HDMI 1.3 and 21.6 Gbit/s for DisplayPort 1.2), permitting WirelessHD to scale to higher resolutions, color depth, and range. The 1.1 version of the specification increases the maximum data rate to 28 Gbit/s, supports common 3D formats, 4K resolution, WPAN data, low-power mode for portable devices, and HDCP 2.0 content protection.

The 60 GHz band usually requires line of sight between transmitter and receiver, and the WirelessHD specification ameliorates this limitation through the use of beam forming at the receiver and transmitter antennas to increase the signal's effective radiated power, find the best path, and utilise wall reflections. The goal range for the first products will be in-room, point-to-point, non line-of-sight (NLOS) at up to 10 meters. The atmospheric absorption of 60 GHz energy by oxygen molecules limits undesired propagation over long distances and helps control intersystem interference and long distance reception, which is a concern to video copyright owners.

The WirelessHD specification has provisions for content encryption via Digital Transmission Content Protection (DTCP) as well as provisions for network management. A standard remote control allows users to control the WirelessHD devices and choose which device will act as the source for the display.

== Competition ==
WirelessHD competes with WiGig in some applications. WiGig transmits in the same 60 GHz band used by WirelessHD.

== See also ==
- Extremely high frequency
- IEEE 802.15
- UWB
- Wireless HDMI:
  - Intel Wireless Display (WiDi) version 3.5 to 6.0 supports Miracast; discontinued
  - Miracast
  - WiGig
  - Wireless Home Digital Interface
- Wi-Fi Direct

ip based:

- Chromecast (proprietary media broadcast over ip: Google Cast for audio or audiovisual playback)
- AirPlay (proprietary ip based)
- Digital Living Network Alliance (DLNA) (ip based)

port / cable standards for mobile equipment:

- Mobile High-Definition Link - MHL
- SlimPort (Mobility DisplayPort), also known as MyDP
