= Wireless Home Digital Interface =

Consumer electronic specification for wireless HDTV connectivity

Wireless Home Digital Interface (WHDI) is a consumer electronic specification for Wireless HDTV connectivity throughout the home.

WHDI enables delivery of uncompressed high-definition digital video over a wireless radio channel connecting any video source (computers, mobile phones, Blu-ray players etc.) to any compatible display device. WHDI was supported by and used in products from companies such as Hitachi, LG Electronics, Motorola, Samsung, Sharp Corporation and Sony, although as of late 2023 the working group leading its development is no longer active.

== Versions ==
The WHDI 1.0 specification was finalized in December 2009. Sharp Corporation will be one of the first companies to roll out wireless HDTVs. AT CES 2010 LG Electronics announced a WHDI wireless HDTV product line.

In June 2010, WHDI announced an update to WHDI 1.0 which allows support for stereoscopic 3D, and WHDI 2.0 specification planned to be completed in Q2 2011.

WHDI 2.0 was planned to increase available bandwidth even further, allowing additional 3D formats such as "dual 1080p60", and support for 4K × 2K resolutions, however as of 2016 no products were launched utilizing the standard.

== Technology ==
WHDI 1.0 provides a high-quality, uncompressed wireless link which supports data rates of up to 3 Gbit/s (allowing 1920×1080 @ 60 Hz @ 24-bit) in a 40 MHz channel, and data rates of up to 1.5 Gbit/s (allowing 1280×720 @ 60 Hz @ 24-bit or 1920×1080 @ 30 Hz @ 24-bit) in a single 20 MHz channel of the 5 GHz unlicensed band, conforming to FCC and worldwide 5 GHz spectrum regulations. Range is beyond 100 feet (30 m), through walls, and latency is less than one millisecond.

== History ==
=== 2005 ===
==== December ====
AMIMON releases news of a device capable of "uncompressed high definition video streaming wirelessly."

=== 2007 ===
==== January ====
AMIMON showcases its WHDI (wireless high definition interface) at CES. Sanyo demonstrates the "world's first wireless HD projector," using AMIMON's technology, which allows for the same quality as a DVI / HDMI cable.

==== August ====
AMIMON begins shipping its WHDI chips to manufacturers.

==== December ====
WHDI becomes High-Bandwidth Digital Content Protection (HDCP) Certified, garnering the necessary approval for any device to deliver HD video to another device, a requirement in Hollywood movie studios. It is considered an Approved Retransmission Technology (ART). The approval allows for WHDI to begin selling devices that will carry HD content to a broader market.

=== 2008 ===
==== April ====
Sharp partners with AMIMON to offer Sharp's X-Series LCD HDTVs offered with WHDI wireless link, the first CE product to use WHDI technology.

==== July ====
AMIMON collaborates with Motorola, Samsung, Sony and Sharp in order to form 'a special interest group to develop a comprehensive new industry standard for multi-room audio, video and control connectivity'.

==== August ====
Mitsubishi announces that it will offer television sets in Japan capable of communicating with WHDI-enabled equipment.

==== September ====
JVC plans to produce a wireless HDMI box to launch in 2009.

==== December ====
AMIMON Ships Its 100,000th Wireless High-definition Chipset.

ABI Research reports wireless HDTV vendors are putting money into products though few are available for consumption in North America.

Stryker Endoscopy's WiSe HDTV will use WHDI and be the first HD wireless display specifically for the operating room, the first use of WHDI technology in the professional market.

=== 2009 ===
==== April ====
AMIMON introduces its second-generation chipset operating in the 5 GHz unlicensed band with AMN 2120 transmitter and AMN 2220 receiver. The chipset is capable of full uncompressed 1080p/60 Hz HD and supports HDCP 2.0. The unit also becomes available to manufacturers.

==== May ====
Gefen begins shipping its WHDI towers, targeting the custom installation market. The towers use AMIMON's 5 GHz technology and can support a maximum of five remote receivers on the same video stream. They support 1080p with Dolby 5.1 surround audio.

==== September ====
Philips launches Wireless HDTV Link with an HDMI transmitter and receiver and 1080p/30 HD video transmission.

Sony announces it will release the ZX5 LCD television in November. It is capable of receiving 1080p wirelessly.

=== 2010 ===
==== January ====
LG announces a partnership with AMIMON and prepares shipment of a wireless HDTV product line with second-generation WHDI technology embedded.

==== July ====
WHDI becomes 3D video capable.

==== September ====
ASUS joins the WHDI Consortium and aligns with AMIMON to introduce the WiCast EW2000. The WiCast connects a PC via USB to an HDTV via HDMI.

==== October ====
Galaxy announces the GeForce GTX 460 WHDI Edition video card. The card is intended for PC gamers.

AMIMON announces the WHDI stick reference design, a noticeably smaller device than those previously released.

==== November ====
HP announces the WHDI certified HP Wireless TV Connect

=== 2011 ===
==== January ====
WHDI comes to TVs, PCs, tablets and a projector at the 2011 Consumer Electronics Show (CES).

KFA2 (Galaxy) releases the first wireless graphics card, GeForce GTX460 WHDI 1024MB PCIe 2.0. The card uses five aerials to stream 1080p video from a PC to a WHDI-capable television.

==== September ====
AMIMON showcases the HD camera link Falcon-HD, a transmitter and receiver accessory for professional HD cameras and monitors at the International Broadcasting Convention (IBC) in Amsterdam.

=== 2012 ===
==== January ====
AMIMON teams up with Lenovo to integrate WHDI technology in the IdeaPad S2 7, removing the need for an external transmitter.

==== April ====
AMIMON launches Falcon, a wireless transmitter/receiver system kit for the professional camera and monitor market, at the National Association of Broadcasters (NAB) Show in Las Vegas.

==== June ====
AMIMON announces the AMIMON Pro Line, using WHDI technology to expand uses from the CE market to the Professional market.

Elmo introduces MO-1w Visual Presenter, the first use of WHDI technology in the presentation industry.

== Supporters ==
Promoters

- AMIMON
- Hitachi
- LG Electronics
- Motorola
- Samsung
- Sharp Corporation
- Sony

Contributors

- D-link
- Haier
- Maxim
- Mitsubishi Electric
- Rohde & Schwarz
- Toshiba

Adopters

- Askey
- ASUS
- ATEN International Co., Ltd.
- Belkin
- Dfine Technology
- Domo Technologies
- Elmo
- Galaxy Microsystems Ltd.
- Gemtek
- Hefei Radio
- Hosiden
- HP
- Hunan space satellite Communication co.ltd.
- IOGear
- Jupiter (MTI)
- LiteOn Technology Corp.
- Murata Manufacturing
- Olympus Corporation
- Quanta Microsystems - QMI
- Seamon Science International
- SRI Radio Systems
- Syvio Image Limited
- TCL Corporation
- TDK
- Telecommunication Metrology Center
- Winstars
- Zinwell

== See also ==
- Ultra-wideband
- Wireless USB
- Wireless HDMI:
  - Intel Wireless Display (WiDi) version 3.5 to 6.0 supports Miracast; discontinued
  - Miracast
  - WirelessHD
  - WiGig
- Wi-Fi Direct
- Chromecast (using Google Cast for audio or audiovisual playback)
- AirPlay
- Digital Living Network Alliance (DLNA)
- Mobile High-Definition Link - MHL
- SlimPort (Mobility DisplayPort), also known as MyDP
