= Wireless HDMI =

Wireless transmission of audio and video

- Communication protocol
- Abbreviation: W-HDMI
- Purpose: Wireless transmission of high-definition audio and video signals between devices
- Developers: Multiple industry consortiums (e.g., WirelessHD Consortium, WHDI, Wi-Fi Alliance)
- Introduction: 2003; 23 years ago
- Based on: HDMI, IEEE 802.11 (Wi-Fi), UWB
- Influenced: Miracast, WirelessVR
- OSI layer: Application layer, Presentation layer
- Hardware: Wireless HDMI transmitters (TX) and receivers (RX)

Wireless HDMI is the wireless transmission of high-definition audio and video signals between devices, using unlicensed radio frequencies such as 2.4 GHz, 5 GHz, and 60 GHz. This technology eliminates the need for an HDMI cable, allowing users to transmit signals wirelessly between the component device and the display device. Wireless HDMI converts the HDMI cable signal into a radio frequency which is broadcast across the wireless spectrum. This allows for video source and display device to be in different rooms, without the need for cables. The technology emerged in the early 2000s.

== Examples ==
- Proprietary protocols for wireless transmission - Many early proprietary systems have been discontinued in favor of industry standards. Examples included LG "Wireless 1080p", Philips "Wireless HDTV Link" (debuted at CES 2007 as the first publicly available wireless HDMI system), Sony "Bravia Wireless Link", and Asus "Wireless Display Connectivity". These have largely been replaced by standardized protocols such as Miracast and WiGig.
- Proprietary video compression schemes that work over 802.11n and similar wireless interfaces
- WirelessHD
- Wireless Home Digital Interface
- WiGig
- Asus WAVI (Wireless Audio Video Interaction) wireless HDMI use 4 x 5 MIMO-channels with Two-Way Wireless USB Control. Note: Many manufacturer-specific wireless HDMI protocols from the 2000s-2010s were phased out as industry standards like Miracast (2012) and WiGig (2012) gained adoption, offering better interoperability across devices and manufacturers.
- In 2010, Intel launched WiDi (Wireless Display) technology, which was integrated into compatible laptops from manufacturers including Toshiba.

== History ==
=== Early Development (2000s) ===
Wireless HDMI systems emerged in the early 2000s as manufacturers sought to eliminate cable connections for HD video transmission. In 2006, TZero Technologies and Analog Devices created a wireless HDMI interface consisting of a transmitter and receiver, expected to cost less than HDMI cable. At CES in 2007, Philips debuted the first publicly available wireless HDMI system.

=== Standards Competition (2009-2012) ===
Multiple competing standards emerged between 2009 and 2012. In May 2009, the Wireless Gigabit Alliance was formed to promote IEEE 802.11ad (WiGig) for 60 GHz wireless transmission. Intel announced WiDi (Wireless Display) technology in January 2010 at CES, integrated into first-generation Core processors. The Wi-Fi Alliance launched Miracast certification in late 2012.This period saw manufacturers supporting multiple proprietary and standards-based protocols simultaneously.

=== Market Consolidation (2013-2020) ===
By 2013, the industry began consolidating around key standards. The WiGig Alliance merged with the Wi-Fi Alliance in March 2013. Miracast gained native support in Windows 8.1 (2013) and Android 4.2, leading Intel to discontinue WiDi in 2016. Many proprietary manufacturer-specific protocols were phased out in favor of industry standards offering better interoperability.

=== Current Era (2021-2025) ===
The market matured into distinct segments: affordable consumer wireless HDMI adapters ($30-150) using 2.4/5 GHz bands with 1080p output, and professional systems ($300+) using 60 GHz for true 4K@60Hz transmission. Miracast became the dominant wireless display standard with over 13,200 certified devices by 2024.

== Modern developments ==
Wireless HDMI systems have steadily grown in popularity. Supporters of this technology claim that it's beneficial for the use of projectors – citing its low cost compared to custom projector mounting solutions, as well as its ease of use. However, with the introduction of streaming sticks such as Amazon's Fire TV and Google's Chromecast into the market, these devices serve different purposes than wireless HDMI systems. Streaming sticks function as standalone media devices with their own remotes, user interfaces, and content apps, making them all-in-one solutions for content consumption. In contrast, wireless HDMI systems simply mirror or extend existing device screens wirelessly without providing content services. As of 2025, both technologies coexist in the market, serving distinct use cases: streaming sticks for accessing streaming services and apps directly on TVs, and wireless HDMI for screen mirroring, presentations, gaming across rooms, and projector installations. Despite the advent of streaming sticks, there are still developments in the area of wireless HDMI technology. For example, in 2020, a patent was sought by Shenzhen Lenkang Technology for a new form of Wireless HDMI system. This new device is to be smaller, utilizing a pin layout rather than a traditional power supply. The HDMI transmitter would be able to receive power through a custom HDMI interface, eliminating the need for a separate power supply, and reducing the size of the unit.

By 2025, wireless HDMI products had evolved into standardized, affordable consumer devices. Modern systems typically feature 4K video decoding with 1080p/60 Hz output, dual-band operation (2.4 GHz and 5 GHz), transmission ranges of 100-330 feet (30-100 meters), and plug-and-play functionality. Consumer models range from $30-$150.

Professional-grade systems emerged with true 4K@60Hz capabilities. The BG-Air4Kast wireless HDMI extender, utilizing IPCOLOR STREAM technology, won multiple awards in 2024, including CEDIA Expo Best of Show and ISE Best in Market, for delivering 4K@60Hz transmission up to 164 feet (approx. 50 metres).

The wireless HDMI video transmitter market is projected to grow at 6.4% annually from 2025 to 2033, reaching 129 million units by 2033. Growth is driven by increasing demand for wireless streaming devices, smart TV adoption, and advancements in wireless technology.

== Technical Specifications and Limitations ==
Most wireless HDMI systems as of 2025 support 4K video input but output at 1080p@60Hz resolution. This limitation exists due to bandwidth constraints of the 2.4 GHz and 5 GHz wireless bands used in consumer devices. Transmitting uncompressed 4K@60Hz video requires approximately 18 Gbps bandwidth, which exceeds the practical capacity of standard Wi-Fi frequencies.

To achieve wireless 4K@60Hz transmission, professional-grade systems utilize 60 GHz technology (such as WiGig) or proprietary compression technologies. These systems are significantly more expensive and have shorter transmission ranges due to the physics of higher frequencies. The 60 GHz signal cannot penetrate walls effectively but can propagate through reflection using beamforming.

Latency in wireless HDMI systems typically ranges from less than 10 milliseconds to 200 milliseconds, depending on the technology and compression used. While acceptable for presentations, video streaming, and casual gaming, this latency may be noticeable in competitive gaming or applications requiring real-time interaction.

== Current Applications ==
As of 2025, wireless HDMI systems are commonly deployed in several key applications:

Business and education environments use wireless HDMI for conference room presentations and classroom displays, eliminating cable clutter and allowing presenters to connect from anywhere in the room.

Home theater installations frequently employ wireless HDMI for projector setups, where running HDMI cables through walls or across rooms is impractical or costly.

Gaming applications allow consoles to connect wirelessly to displays in different rooms, though competitive gaming may experience latency issues.

Professional installations include security camera monitoring systems, digital signage, and broadcast applications requiring stable wireless video transmission.

The choice between consumer-grade and professional-grade systems depends on requirements: consumer models prioritize affordability and 1080p output, while professional systems offer true 4K@60Hz support with lower latency for demanding applications.

== See also ==
- WirelessHD - A 60 GHz wireless HD standard developed by the WirelessHD Consortium (including Dell, Intel, LG, Samsung, Sony, and Toshiba). Capable of transmitting uncompressed HD video at approximately 4 Gbps. Despite early promise, WirelessHD saw limited commercial adoption compared to WiGig and Miracast standards. The consortium continues to exist but market presence remains minimal.
- Wireless Home Digital Interface (WHDI) - Operates on the 5 GHz band with transmission speeds of approximately 3 Gbps, capable of covering whole-home distances. Backed by Sony, Samsung, LG, and others. WHDI technology shifted toward specialized applications such as high-end video production and real-time HD content streaming rather than mainstream consumer electronics. Products based on Amimon chips were available in the early 2010s.
- WiGig (Wireless Gigabit) - IEEE 802.11ad standard operating on 60 GHz spectrum, capable of multi-gigabit speeds up to 7 Gbit/s. The second-generation standard, IEEE 802.11ay, was published in July 2021, supporting transmission rates of 20-40 Gbit/s at distances of 300-500 meters. The WiGig Alliance was absorbed by the Wi-Fi Alliance in 2013. WiGig certification program launched in 2016. Despite technical capabilities, WiGig adoption remained limited to specialized applications such as wireless VR headsets and laptop docking stations. Intel discontinued its WiGig products, with support ending and users directed to OEMs for assistance.
- WiDi (Intel Wireless Display) - versions 3.5 to 6.0 supported Miracast. Intel discontinued WiDi in 2016, ending marketing and development in favor of Miracast, which became natively supported in Windows 8.1 and later. Software downloads were removed in August 2016, and customer support ended by December 2016.
- Miracast (wireless display technology) - A Wi-Fi Alliance standard for wireless screen mirroring, now a subset of Wi-Fi Direct certification. Natively supported in Windows 8.1 and later, and Android 4.2 and later. As of 2024, over 13,200 certified devices available, with market valued at $5.29 billion and projected 11.1% annual growth through 2031.

IP based

- Chromecast (proprietary media broadcast over IP: Google Cast for audio or audiovisual playback)
- AirPlay (proprietary IP based)
- Digital Living Network Alliance (DLNA) (IP based)

Cables for mobile equipment

- Mobile High-Definition Link - MHL
- SlimPort (Mobility DisplayPort), also known as MyDP
