= WiDi =

Wireless display technology by Intel

Intel WiDi
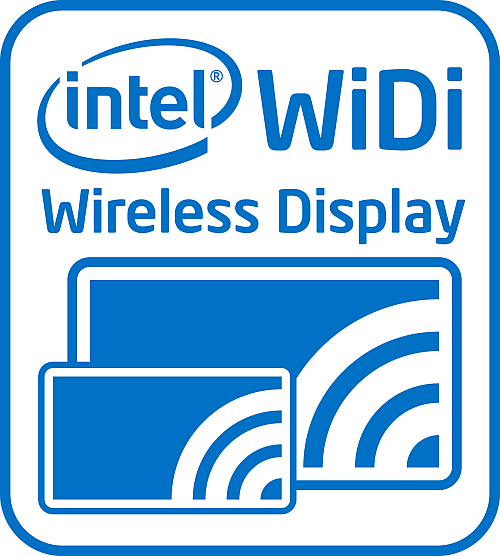
- Logo
- Date invented: 2006
- Manufacturer: Intel
- Introduced: 2010; 15 years ago
- Discontinued: Yes
- Type: Wireless Display-Distribution System
- Connection: Wi-Fi Direct

Wireless Display (WiDi) is discontinued technology developed by Intel that enables users to stream music, movies, photos, videos and apps without cables from a compatible computer to a compatible HDTV or through the use of an adapter with other HDTVs or computer monitors. Intel WiDi supports HD 1080p video quality, 5.1 surround sound, and low latency for interacting with applications sent to the TV from a PC running Windows 7 or later.

Using the Intel WiDi Widget, users can perform different functions simultaneously on their PC and TV such as checking email on the PC while streaming a movie to the TV from the same device. WiDi development was discontinued in 2016 in favor of Miracast, a standard developed by the Wi-Fi Alliance and natively supported by Windows 8.1 and later.

Intel's Wireless Display should not be confused with Microsoft's Windows 11 operating system's built-in Wireless Display app (formerly Connect) which works with Miracast.

== Version history ==
- 2010 - WiDi 1.0 - Supports 720p
- 2011 - WiDi 2.0 - Supports 1080p
- 2012 - WiDi 3.0 - Supports 1080p @ 60 FPS
- September 2012 - WiDi 3.5 - Supports Windows 8, touch functionality, 1080p output, 3D content, HDCP2, Blu-ray, and USB devices and Miracast.
- 2013 - WiDi 4.0
- 2014 - WiDi 4.1
- 2014 - WiDi 4.2 - 5 GHz Wi-Fi support (with compatible receiver)
- 2015 - WiDi 5.1 - Supports 4k - Ultra HD displays
- 2015 - WiDi 6.0
- October 2015 - The marketing and development of WiDi applications was discontinued by Intel, who said that this was because the Miracast standard was natively supported in Windows for wireless display.

=== Miracast ===
The Miracast standard is supported in Intel Wireless Display versions 3.5 through 6.0, when it was discontinued. After this development, Intel recommended that business users utilize Intel Unite as a platform for collaboration. Miracast was included in Android 4.2 smart phones through Android 7, and on Windows 8.1 and 10. It can stream on TVs, projectors, and media players.

== See also ==
- AirPlay
- Chromecast
- Digital Living Network Alliance (DLNA)
- DisplayLink
- Google Cast
- Matter Casting
- Mobile High-Definition Link - MHL
- SlimPort (Mobility DisplayPort), also known as MyDP
- Ultra-wideband
- Wireless HDMI:
  - WiGig
  - WirelessHD
  - Wireless Home Digital Interface
- Wi-Fi Direct
- WaPi
