= Uncompressed video =

High-fidelity digital video signal

Uncompressed video is digital video that either has never been compressed or was generated by decompressing previously compressed digital video. It is commonly used by video cameras, video monitors, video recording devices (including general-purpose computers), and in video processors that perform functions such as image resizing, image rotation, deinterlacing, and text and graphics overlay. It is conveyed over various types of baseband digital video interfaces, such as HDMI, DVI, DisplayPort and SDI. Standards also exist for the carriage of uncompressed video over computer networks.

Some HD video cameras output uncompressed video, whereas others compress the video using a lossy compression method such as MPEG or H.264. In any lossy compression process, some of the video information is removed, which creates compression artifacts and reduces the quality of the resulting decompressed video. When editing video, it is preferred to work with video that has never been compressed (or was losslessly compressed) as this maintains the best possible quality, with compression performed after completion of editing.

Uncompressed video should not be confused with raw video. Raw video represents largely unprocessed data (e.g., without demosaicing) captured by an imaging device.

== Recording ==
A standalone video recorder is a device that receives uncompressed video and stores it in either uncompressed or compressed form. These devices typically have a video output that can be used to monitor or playback recorded video. When playing back compressed video, the compressed video is uncompressed by the device before being output. Such devices may also have a communication interface, such as Ethernet or USB, which can be used to exchange video files with an external computer, and in some cases, control the recorder from an external computer as well.

Recording to a computer is a relatively inexpensive alternative to implementing a digital video recorder, but the computer and its video storage device (e.g., solid-state drive, RAID) must be fast enough to keep up with the high video data rate, which in some cases may be HD video or multiple video sources, or both. Due to the extreme computational and storage system performance demands of real-time video processing, other unnecessary program activity (e.g., background processes, virus scanners) and asynchronous hardware interfaces (e.g., computer networks) may be disabled, and the process priority of the recording realtime process may be increased, to avoid disruption of the recording process.

HDMI, DVI and HD-SDI inputs are available as PCI Express (partly multi-channel) or ExpressCard, USB 3.0 and Thunderbolt interface also for 2160p (4K resolution).

Software for recording uncompressed video is often supplied with suitable hardware or available for free, e.g., Ingex.

== Network transmission ==
SMPTE 2022 and 2110 are standards for professional digital video over IP networks. SMPTE 2022 includes provisions for both compressed and uncompressed video formats. SMPTE 2110 carries uncompressed video, audio, and ancillary data as separate streams.

Wireless interfaces such as Wireless LAN (WLAN, Wi-Fi), WiDi, and Wireless Home Digital Interface can be used to transmit uncompressed standard definition (SD) video but not HD video, because the HD bit rates would exceed the network bandwidth. HD can be transmitted using higher-speed interfaces such as WirelessHD and WiGig. In all cases, when video is conveyed over a network, communication disruptions or diminished bandwidth can corrupt the video or prevent its transmission.

== Data rates ==
Uncompressed video has a constant bitrate that is based on pixel representation, image resolution, and frame rate:

data rate = color depth (Note: Most of the time, color depth can be calculated as 3 × single color depth. For example, values of a single color can be represented with a range from 0 to 255 (8 bits) which gives a total color depth as 3 × 8 = 24.) × vertical resolution × horizontal resolution × refresh frequency

For example:

- 16-bit, 480i @ 30 fps: 16 × 640 × 240 (Note: Interlaced video formats transmit every other line, half the picture content, per field period. Two fields are required for a full frame so the vertical resolution is halved and the refresh rate doubled in this calculation.) × 60 = 147.6 Mbit/s
- 24-bit, 480p @ 30 fps: 24 × 640 × 480 × 30 = 221 Mbit/s.
- 24-bit, 720p @ 30 fps: 24 × 1280 × 720 × 30 = 663 Mbit/s.
- 24-bit, 720p @ 60 fps: 24 × 1280 × 720 × 60 = 1.32 Gbit/s
- 24-bit, 1080i @ 30 fps: 24 × 1920 × 540 × 30 = 498 Mbit/s.
- 24-bit, 1080p @ 60 fps: 24 × 1920 × 1080 × 60 = 2.98 Gbit/s.
- 24-bit, 4K UHD @ 60 fps: 24 × 3840 × 2160 × 60 = 11.9 Gbit/s.
- 24-bit, 4K UHD @ 120 fps: 24 × 3840 × 2160 × 120 = 23.8 Gbit/s.
- 48-bit, DCI 4K @ 144 fps: 48 × 4096 × 2160 × 144 = 61.1 Gbit/s.

The actual data rate may be higher because some transmission media for uncompressed video require defined blanking intervals, which effectively add unused pixels around the visible image.

== See also ==
- Data compression
- DPX and MXF files – used in professional video files systems
- List of cameras supporting a raw format
- List of codecs § Lossless video compression
- Nikon Expeed Video processor
- TIFF files – used in AV and professional video file systems
- Uncompressed audio
