= Raw video =

- Raw image format – File format used in digital photography
- Uncompressed video – High-fidelity digital video signal
