= SiBeam =

SiBEAM Inc.
- Type: Subsidiary
- Industry: Semiconductor
- Founded: 2004
- Headquarters: Sunnyvale, California, United States
- Parent: Lattice Semiconductor
- Website: www.sibeam.com

SiBEAM Inc., a wholly owned subsidiary of Lattice Semiconductor, is a fabless semiconductor company that provides integrated circuits and system products for millimeter-wave (mmWave) wireless communications and sensing.

SiBEAM is based in Sunnyvale and was founded in 2004 to commercialize pioneering millimeter wave wireless technology developed at the labs of University of California, Berkeley.

== History ==
SiBEAM was founded in 2004 by researchers in wireless communications from the University of California, Berkeley. Backed by companies including Panasonic, Samsung, Cisco Systems, and Best Buy. The company raised over $112 million of venture capital financing from U.S. Venture Partners, New Enterprise Associates, Foundation Capital, and Lux Capital in 2004, 2005, 2006, 2008, and 2010. SiBEAM was noted by several publications as one of the promising startup companies in its industry.

In April, 2011 SiBEAM was acquired by Silicon Image for $25.5 million in cash and Silicon Image stock.

On January 5, 2015 Silicon Image Re-Launched SiBEAM, Inc. as a wholly owned subsidiary to drive market development of millimeter-wave products, technologies and solutions.

On March 15, 2015, Silicon Image was acquired by Lattice Semiconductor in an all-cash acquisition, valued at approximately $606.6 million (or approximately $466.6 million on an enterprise value basis). SiBEAM became a direct wholly owned subsidiary of Lattice Semiconductor on June 1, 2015.

On July 18, 2018, Lattice Semiconductor announced that it "will discontinue its millimeter wave business."

== Products ==
When SiBeam was active the company focused on products using the 60Ghz-Range, including the low-range "Snap" family used in wireless connectors which were thought to be able to replace USB ports, chips transmitting video data to enable wireless monitors, as well as modules supporting transmission ranges up to 300m, like the 2017 launched MOD65412. SiBEAM's WirelessHD protcocol was used in notebooks, like the Alienware M17x R3 or the G73JW and is still an alternative to video transmissions over the 5GHz WiFi band.
