= Miracast =

Peer-to-peer wireless screencasting standard

- Communication protocol
- Purpose: Wireless peer-to-peer screen mirroring and audio/video streaming
- Developer: Wi-Fi Alliance
- Introduction: 19 September 2012; 14 years ago
- Based on: Wi-Fi Direct, WPS, H.264/MPEG-4 AVC
- Influenced: Miracast over Infrastructure (MS-MICE), WirelessVR
- OSI layer: Application layer (RTSP/RTP), Transport layer (TCP/UDP), Data link layer (Wi-Fi)
- Port: 7236 (RTSP control)
- Hardware: Wi-Fi certified wireless display adapters, Smart TVs, smartphones, and laptops
- Website: www.wi-fi.org/discover-wi-fi/miracast

Miracast is a wireless communications standard created by the Wi-Fi Alliance which is designed to transmit video and sound from devices (such as laptops or smartphones) to display receivers (such as TVs, monitors, or projectors). It uses Wi-Fi Direct to create an ad hoc encrypted Wi-Fi connection and can roughly be described as "HDMI over Wi-Fi", replacing cables in favor of radio waves. Miracast is utilised in many devices and is used or branded under various names by different manufacturers, including Smart View (by Samsung), SmartShare (by LG), screen mirroring (by Sony), easy mirroring (by Panasonic), Cast (in Windows 11) and Connect (in Windows 10), wireless display and screen casting.

A related enterprise protocol named Miracast over Infrastructure (MS-MICE) functions using a central local area network instead and is supported in Microsoft Windows.

== Development ==
The Wi-Fi Alliance launched the Miracast certification program at the end of 2012. Devices that are Miracast-certified can communicate with each other, regardless of manufacturer. Nvidia announced support in 2012 for their Tegra 3 platform, and Freescale Semiconductor, Texas Instruments, Qualcomm, Marvell Technology Group and other chip vendors have also announced their plans to support the Miracast standard.

The Wi-Fi Alliance maintains a list of certified device models, which numbered over 13,200 as of 31 October 2024.

=== Technical details ===
Miracast is based on the peer-to-peer Wi-Fi Direct standard. It allows sending up to 1080p HD video (H.264 codec) and 5.1 surround sound (AAC and AC3 are optional codecs, mandated codec is linear pulse-code modulation – 16 bits 48 kHz 2 channels). The connection is created via WPS and therefore is secured with WPA2. IPv4 is used on the Internet layer. On the transport layer, TCP or UDP are used. On the application layer, the stream is initiated and controlled via RTSP, RTP for the data transfer.

=== Version history ===
| Version | Date | Remarks |
|---|---|---|
| 1.0 | 2012-08-24 | Public release version. |
| 1.1 | 2014-04-24 | Public release for HDCPv2.2 updates. |
| 2.0 | 2017-04-21 | Release 2 final version. |
| 2.1 | 2017-07-21 | Corrected heading errors in sections 4.3 and 4.4. Miracast as a use for Wi-Fi Direct. Miracast hardware now supports HD, FHD and 4K screen streaming. |
| 2.2 | 2021-12-31 | |
| 2.3 | 2024-06-27 | Minor editorial updates. |

== Functionality ==
The technology was promoted to work across devices, regardless of brand. Miracast devices negotiate settings for each connection, which simplifies the process for the users. In particular, it obviates having to worry about format or codec details. Miracast is "effectively a wireless HDMI cable, copying everything from one screen to another using the H.264 codec and its own digital rights management (DRM) layer emulating the HDMI system". The Wi-Fi Alliance suggested that Miracast could also be used by a set-top box wanting to stream content to a TV or tablet.

Both devices (the sender and the receiver) need to be Miracast certified for the technology to work. However, to stream music and movies to a non-certified device, Miracast adapters are available that plug into HDMI or USB ports. Certification does not mandate a maximum latency (i.e. the time between the display of pictures on the source and display of the mirrored image on the sync display). Even with certification, it is possible an underpowered device will be constrained in performance or bandwidth.

=== Types of media streamed ===
Miracast can stream videos that are in 1080p, media with DRM such as DVDs, as well as protected premium content streaming, enabling devices to stream feature films and other copy-protected materials. This is accomplished by using a Wi-Fi version of the same trusted content mechanisms used on cable-based HDMI and DisplayPort connections.

==== Display resolution ====
- 27 Consumer Electronics Association (CEA) formats, from 640 × 480 up to 4096 × 2160 pixels, and from 24 to 60 frames per second (fps)
- 34 Video Electronics Standards Association (VESA) formats, from 800 × 600 up to 2560 × 1600 pixels, and from 30 to 60 fps
- 12 handheld formats, from 640 × 360 up to 960 × 540 pixels, and from 30 to 60 fps
- Mandatory: 1280 × 720p30 (HD)
- Optional: 3840 × 2160p60 (4K Ultra HD)

==== Video ====
Mandatory: ITU-T H.264 (Advanced Video Coding [AVC]) for HD and Ultra HD video; supports several profiles in transcoding and non-transcoding modes, including Constrained Baseline Profile (CBP), at levels ranging from 3.1 to 5.2

Optional: ITU-T H.265 (High Efficiency Video Coding [HEVC]) for HD and Ultra HD video; supports several profiles in transcoding and non-transcoding modes, including Main Profile, Main 444, SCC-8 bit 444, Main 444 10, at levels ranging from 3.1 to 5.1

==== Audio ====
Mandated audio codec: Linear Pulse-Code Modulation (LPCM) 16 bits, 48 kHz sampling, 2 channels

Optional audio codecs, including:

- LPCM mode 16 bits, 44.1 kHz sampling, 2 channels
- Advanced Audio Coding (AAC) modes
- Dolby Advanced Codec 3 (AC3) modes
- E-AC-3
- Dolby TrueHD, Dolby MAT modes
- DTS-HD mode
- MPEG-4 AAC and MPEG-H 3D Audio modes
- AAC-ELDv2

== Hardware and software support ==
A device's wireless network adapter must support Wi-Fi Direct and Virtual Wi-Fi for it to work with Miracast; generally most adapters built since 2013 should meet the criteria. In Windows computers this can be checked by looking at the adapter's NDIS version which must be 6.3 or above. However Miracast support also depends on the software implementation by manufacturers. Most modern devices support Miracast, with notable exceptions being products from Google and Apple.

=== Windows and Linux PCs ===
Cast in Windows 11 having discovered three Miracast receivers and attempting to connect to one (shortcut ⊞ Win+K)

Microsoft also added support for Miracast in Windows 8.1 (announced in June 2013) and available on hardware with supported Miracast drivers from hardware (GPU) manufacturers. Windows 10 and Windows 11 support Miracast transmitting along with User Input Back Channel (UIBC) support to allow for human interface devices (touch screens, mouse, keyboard) abbreviated as HID, to also have wireless connectivity (provided the host hardware also supports this). The transmit feature is built-in from launch for all Miracast devices with no additional setup past using the WIN+K keystroke to pair with a compatible display sink (including Microsoft's own Wireless Display Adapter).

Developers can also implement Miracast on top of the built-in Wi-Fi Direct support in Windows 7 and Windows 8. Windows 8.1 supports broadcasting/sending the screen via Miracast. Another way to support Miracast in Windows is with Intel's proprietary WiDi (v3.5 or higher).

While Linux does not feature native support, several add-on software solutions exist. In the GNOME ecosystem, the GNOME Network Displays application has allowed for Miracast screen sharing. As part of the 2023 Google Summer of Code, an effort to integrate this as a feature in the GNOME Settings was announced, which would mean functionality would be had out of the box with that desktop environment.

==== Windows Wireless Display ====
Windows 11 and Windows 10 (since Windows 10 version 2004) also have the ability to use Miracast to make a monitor display (of a computer running Windows) act as a secondary screen of another device. This feature can be set up in the Projecting to this PC setting. It requires the downloading of the optional Wireless Display add-in feature in Windows, which adds the UWP-based Wireless Display app (known as Connect before Windows 11 version 22H2) and is launched on the receiving device.

=== Android ===
Smart View icon, which appears in the Samsung One UI quick settings panel or when viewing media in the Gallery

Miracast support was built into stock Android as of version 4.2 (Android Jelly Bean) - as of January 2013, the LG Nexus 4 and Sony's Xperia Z, ZL, T and V officially supported the function, as did HTC One, Motorola in their Droid Maxx and Droid Ultra flagships, and Samsung in its Galaxy S III and Galaxy Note II under the moniker AllShare Cast. The Galaxy S4 uses Samsung Link for its implementation. Some devices such as the Nexus 7 don't support it due to hardware limitations.

Since Android 6.0 Marshmallow released in 2015, Google dropped Miracast support in favor of their own proprietary Google Cast protocol which was introduced with their Chromecast device. Many device manufacturers have retained Miracast support through their customized versions of Android (for example: Smart View on Samsung's One UI, Cast on Xiaomi's MIUI, Screencast on Oppo's ColorOS, Wireless Projection on Huawei's EMUI, HTC Sense, LG UX, Asus ZenUI, Sony Xperia devices, OnePlus's OxygenOS etc.). The performance and quality of the streamed video is dependent on the device's hardware.

Nokia devices, which ran a near-stock version of Android, originally did not support Miracast. However, Nokia 7 Plus, 8, 8 Sirocco, and 8.1 smartphones that have been upgraded to Android 9 or 10 are able to support Miracast, after enabling Wireless Display Certification in Developer Options. Devices such as Nokia 2.3, 2.4, 3.4, 5.4, and 8.3 5G have Miracast support enabled by default. The same option is present to stock Android as well, with Google describing it as based on the "Wi-Fi Alliance Wi-Fi Display Specification", but it tends to be useless as Miracast code was removed.

=== Televisions and dongles ===
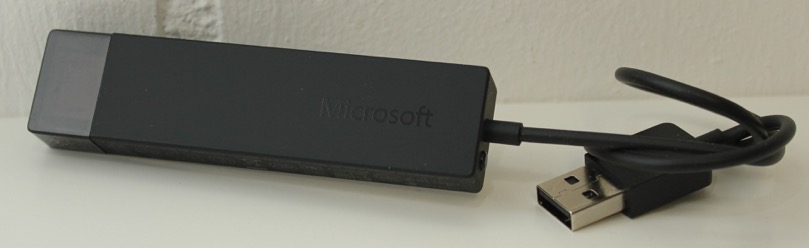
The Microsoft Wireless Display Adapter, a Miracast HDMI dongle

Samsung televisions support Miracast where it is named Smart View (including all models made since 2016). Miracast is also supported on LG smart TV models, some Toshiba TVs, Sharp, Philips (Wireless Screencasting), and Panasonic televisions and Blu-ray players. Sony Bravia models of televisions released between 2013 and 2020 normally have Miracast. The feature is named screen mirroring. Newer models with Android TV instead make use of the Google Cast protocol.

On 23 September 2014, Microsoft announced the Microsoft Wireless Display Adaptor, a USB-powered HDMI dongle for high definition televisions. Simple dongles such as these can be used to provide Miracast to a television (or other display) that lacks the feature built-in.

=== Miscellaneous ===
- Xbox One since 2019 using the optional downloadable Wireless Display app.
- Windows Phone 8.1.
- BlackBerry 10 devices since update 10.2.1 in 2013 (as of March 2015, the BlackBerry Q10, Q5, Z30, and later models support Miracast streaming).
- Ubuntu Touch-powered Meizu Pro 5 supported Miracast in OTA-11.
- The Roku streaming stick and Roku TV (starting October 2014).
- Most Amazon Fire TV models (except 2017 Fire TV with 4K Ultra HD and Alexa Voice Remote).
- HTC Vive
- ScreenBeam from Actiontec Electronics

== Miracast over Infrastructure ==
Miracast over Infrastructure Connection Establishment Protocol (MS-MICE) allows the capabilities of Miracast but through a local network instead of directly. It has been supported in Microsoft Windows since Windows 10, version 1703. MS-MICE connects with computers that are connected to the network via secure Wi-Fi or through Ethernet.

== See also ==
- AirPlay
- Discovery and Launch (used by Netflix app)
- Digital Living Network Alliance (DLNA)
- WiDi version 3.5 to 6.0 supports Miracast; discontinued
- Google Cast
- Smart Display (codename Mira, early 2002 screencasting by Microsoft)
- Wireless HDMI
- FCast
