= Wi-Fi Direct =

Wi-Fi standard for peer-to-peer wireless connections

- Wi-Fi Peer-to-Peer (P2P) Specification
- Certified under the Wi-Fi Alliance framework

General Information
- Developed by: Wi-Fi Alliance
- Introduced: 2009
- Active Status: Active / Published
- Latest Protocol Version: v1.9

Architecture & Specifications
- Underlying Standard: IEEE 802.11 (Wi-Fi)
- Topology Type: Single-hop Star (via Soft AP Group Owner)
- Frequency Bands: 2.4 GHz & 5 GHz
- Security Framework: WPA2, Wi-Fi Protected Setup (WPS)

Ecosystem & Dependencies
- Key Applications: Miracast (Screencasting), File sharing, Wireless printing
- Market Alternatives: Bluetooth, AirDrop (iOS/macOS implementation)
- Official Wi-Fi Direct Portal

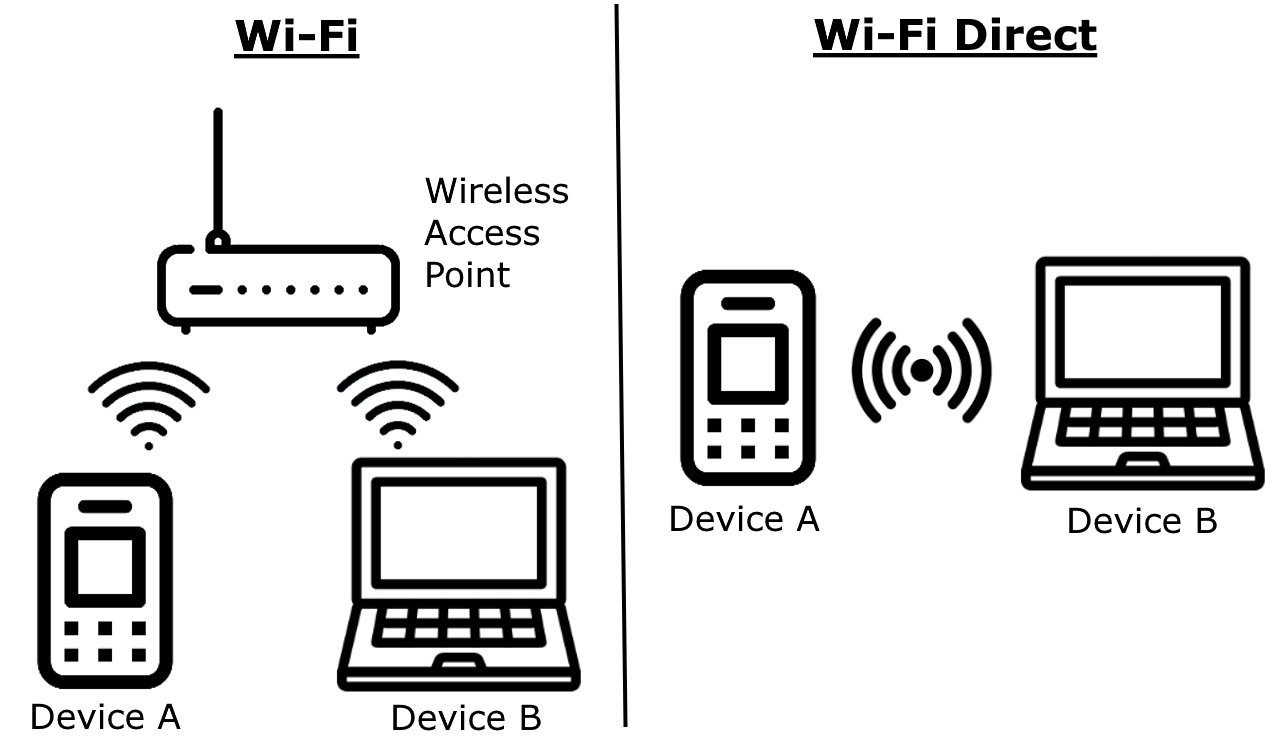
Diagram explaining conventional Wi-Fi (left) and Wi-Fi Direct (right)

Wi-Fi Direct is a Wi-Fi standard for wireless connections that allows two devices to establish a direct Wi-Fi connection without an intermediary wireless access point, router, or Internet connection. Wi-Fi Direct is single-hop communication, rather than multi-hop communication like wireless ad hoc networks. The Wi-Fi Direct standard was specified in 2009.

The standard has been used for file transfer, casting and projecting with Miracast, wireless printing, and to communicate with one or more devices simultaneously at typical Wi-Fi speeds (IEEE 802.11) without requiring a hotspot or an Internet connection. It is therefore similar to Bluetooth technology but offers a longer range. Only one of the Wi-Fi devices needs to be compliant with Wi-Fi Direct to establish a peer-to-peer connection.

Wi-Fi Direct negotiates the link with a Wi-Fi Protected Setup system that assigns each device a limited wireless access point. The "pairing" of Wi-Fi Direct devices can be set up to require the proximity of a near field communication, a Bluetooth signal, or a button press on one or all the devices. Simultaneous connections also allow one device connected via an infrastructure local area network to the Internet to share the Internet connection to devices it is connected through Wi-Fi Direct.

== Background ==
=== Basic Wi-Fi ===
Conventional Wi-Fi networks are typically based on the presence of controller devices known as wireless access points. These devices normally combine three primary functions:

- Physical support for wireless and wired networking
- Bridging between devices on the network
- Service provisioning to add and remove devices from the network.

A typical Wi-Fi home network includes laptops, tablets and phones, devices like modern printers, music devices, and televisions. Most Wi-Fi networks are set up in infrastructure mode, where the access point acts as a central hub to which Wi-Fi capable devices are connected. All communication between devices goes through the access point.

In contrast, Wi-Fi Direct devices are able to communicate with each other without requiring a dedicated wireless access point. The Wi-Fi Direct devices negotiate when they first connect to determine which device shall act as an access point.

=== Automated setup ===
With the increase in the number and type of devices attaching to Wi-Fi systems, the basic model of a simple router with smart computers became increasingly strained. At the same time, the increasing sophistication of the hot spots presented setup problems for the users. To address these problems, there have been numerous attempts to simplify certain aspects of the setup task.

A common example is the Wi-Fi Protected Setup system included in most access points manufactured since 2007 when the standard was introduced. Wi-Fi Protected Setup allows access points to be set up simply by entering a PIN or other identification into a connection screen, or in some cases, simply by pressing a button. The Protected Setup system uses this information to send data to a computer, handing it the information needed to complete the network setup and connect to the Internet. From the user's point of view, a single click replaces the multi-step, jargon-filled setup experience formerly required.

While the Protected Setup model works as intended, it was intended only to simplify the connection between the access point and the devices that would make use of its services, primarily accessing the Internet. It provides little help within a network - finding and setting up printer access from a computer for instance. To address those roles, a number of different protocols have developed, including Universal Plug and Play (UPnP), Devices Profile for Web Services (DPWS), and zero-configuration networking (ZeroConf). These protocols allow devices to seek out other devices within the network, query their capabilities, and provide some level of automatic setup.

=== Wi-Fi Direct ===
Wi-Fi Direct has become a standard feature in smart phones and portable media players, and in feature phones as well. The process of adding Wi-Fi to smaller devices has accelerated, and it is now possible to find printers, cameras, scanners, and many other common devices with Wi-Fi in addition to other connections, like USB.

The widespread adoption of Wi-Fi in new classes of smaller devices made the need for ad hoc networking much more important. Even without a central Wi-Fi hub or router, it would be useful for a laptop computer to be able to wirelessly connect to a local printer. Although the ad hoc mode was created to address this sort of need, the lack of additional information for discovery makes it difficult to use in practice.

Although systems like UPnP and Bonjour provide many of the needed capabilities and are included in some devices, a single widely supported standard was lacking, and support within existing devices was far from universal. A guest using their smart phone would likely be able to find a hotspot and connect to the Internet with ease, perhaps using Protected Setup to do so. But, the same device would find that streaming music to a computer or printing a file might be difficult, or simply not supported between differing brands of hardware.

Wi-Fi Direct can provide a wireless connection to peripherals. Wireless mice, keyboards, remote controls, headsets, speakers, displays, and many other functions can be implemented with Wi-Fi Direct. This has begun with Wi-Fi mouse products, and Wi-Fi Direct remote controls that were shipping circa November 2012.

File sharing applications such as SHAREit on Android and BlackBerry 10 devices could use Wi-Fi Direct, with most Android version 4.1 (Jellybean), introduced in July 2012, and BlackBerry 10.2 supported. Android version 4.2 (Jellybean) included further refinements to Wi-Fi Direct including persistent permissions enabling two-way transfer of data between multiple devices.

The Miracast standard for the wireless connection of devices to displays is based on Wi-Fi direct.

== Technical description ==
Wi-Fi Direct essentially embeds a software access point ("Soft AP") into any device that must support Direct. The soft AP provides a version of Wi-Fi Protected Setup with its push-button or PIN-based setup.

When a device enters the range of the Wi-Fi Direct host, it can connect to it, and then gather setup information using a Protected Setup-style transfer. Connection and setup is so simplified that it may replace Bluetooth in some situations.

Soft APs can be as simple or as complex as the role requires. A digital picture frame might provide only the most basic services needed to allow digital cameras to connect and upload images. A smart phone that allows data tethering might run a more complex soft AP that adds the ability to route to the Internet. The standard also includes WPA2 security and features to control access within corporate networks. Wi-Fi Direct-certified devices can connect one-to-one or one-to-many and not all connected products need to be Wi-Fi Direct-certified. One Wi-Fi Direct enabled device can connect to legacy Wi-Fi certified devices.

The Wi-Fi Direct certification program is developed and administered by the Wi-Fi Alliance, the industry group that owns the "Wi-Fi" trademark. The specification is available for purchase from the Wi-Fi Alliance.

== Commercialization ==
=== Laptops ===
Intel included Wi-Fi Direct on the Centrino 2 platform, in its My WiFi technology by 2008. Wi-Fi Direct devices can connect to a notebook computer that plays the role of a software Access Point (AP). The notebook computer can then provide Internet access to the Wi-Fi Direct-enabled devices without a Wi-Fi AP. Marvell Technology Group, Atheros, Broadcom, Intel, Ralink, and Realtek announced their first products in October 2010. Redpine Signals's chipset was Wi-Fi Direct certified in November of the same year.

=== Mobile devices ===
An icon to indicate Wi-Fi Direct operation under Android

Google announced Wi-Fi Direct support in Android 4.0 in October 2011. While some Android 2.3 devices like Samsung Galaxy S II have had this feature through proprietary operating system extensions developed by OEMs, the Galaxy Nexus (released November 2011) was the first Android device to ship with Google's implementation of this feature and an API for developers. Ozmo Devices, which developed integrated circuits (chips) designed for Wi-Fi Direct, was acquired by Atmel in 2012.

Wi-Fi Direct became available with the BlackBerry 10.2 upgrade.

As of March 2016, no iPhone device implements Wi-Fi Direct; instead, iOS has its own proprietary feature, namely Apple's MultipeerConnectivity. This protocol and others are used in the feature AirDrop, used for sharing both trivial-sized content like links and contact cards, and large files of any size, between Apple devices without the need for network infrastructure. Wi‑Fi Direct was meant to bring somewhat similar capabilities to other devices.

=== Game consoles ===
The Xbox One, released in 2013, supports Wi-Fi Direct.

NVIDIA's SHIELD controller uses Wi-Fi Direct to connect to compatible devices. NVIDIA claims a reduction in latency and increase in throughput over competing Bluetooth controllers.

== See also ==
- Wireless mesh network
- DLNA
- Bluetooth
- FiRa Consortium
- Li-Fi
- TDLS
- Ultra-wideband
- Wireless HDMI
- Wi-Fi Aware – Wi-Fi technology for proximity-based service discovery and direct device communication
