= Chromecast =

Line of digital media players developed by Google

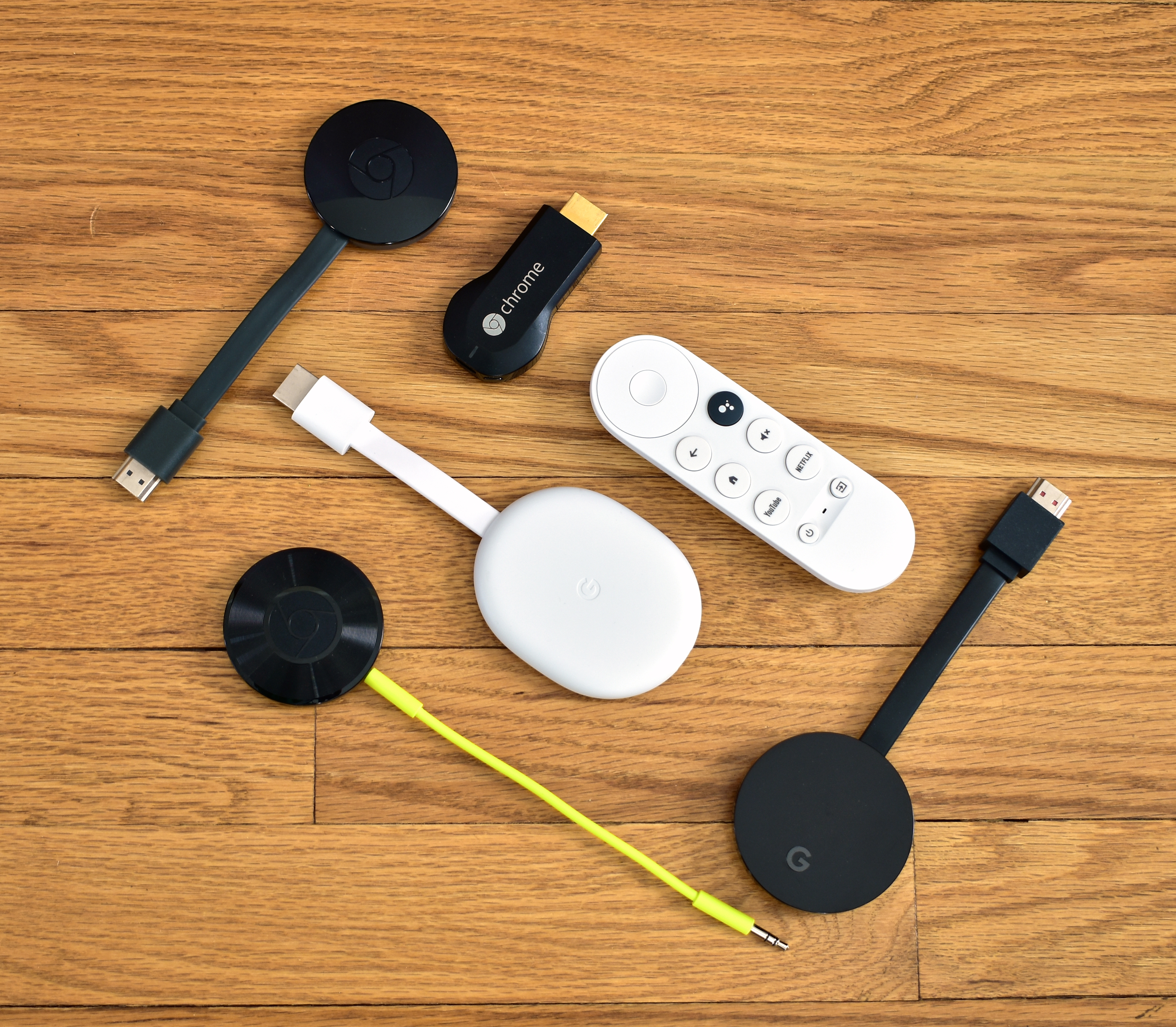
- A collection of devices released under the Chromecast product line
- Developer: Google
- Manufacturer: Google
- Type: Digital media player
- Released: 1st gen: July 24, 2013; 2nd gen and Audio: September 29, 2015; Ultra: November 6, 2016; 3rd gen: October 10, 2018; w/Google TV (4K): September 30, 2020; w/Google TV (HD): September 22, 2022
- Introductory price: 1st, 2nd, 3rd gen, and Audio: US$35 / £30; Ultra: US$69; w/Google TV (4K): US$49.99; w/Google TV (HD): US$29.99
- Discontinued: August 6, 2024
- Units sold: 100 million
- Display: 1080p (1st, 2nd, 3rd gen, w/Google TV (HD)); 4K Ultra HD (Ultra and w/Google TV (4K))
- Connectivity: Wi-Fi; HDMI (video models); Bluetooth (w/Google TV); 3.5 mm audio jack / mini-TOSLINK socket (Audio); Ethernet (with Ethernet power adapter)
- Power: Micro-USB (1st, 2nd, 3rd gen, Audio, and Ultra); USB-C (w/Google TV)
- Predecessor: Nexus Q
- Successor: Google TV Streamer
- Website: chromecast.com

Chromecast is a line of digital media players that was developed by Google from 2013 to 2024. The devices, designed as small dongles, can play Internet-streamed audio-visual content on a high-definition television or home audio system. The user can control playback with a mobile device or personal computer through mobile and web apps that can use the Google Cast protocol, or by issuing commands via Google Assistant; later models introduced a navigable user interface and remote control. Content can be mirrored to video models from the Google Chrome web browser on a personal computer or from the screen of some Android devices.

The first-generation Chromecast, a video streaming device, was announced on July 24, 2013, and made available for purchase on the same day in the United States for US$35 (equivalent to $48.38 in 2025). The second-generation Chromecast and an audio-only model called Chromecast Audio were released in September 2015. A model called Chromecast Ultra that can display 4K resolution and high dynamic range was released in November 2016. A third generation of the HD video Chromecast was released in October 2018. The final models, called Chromecast with Google TV, were the first in the product line to feature an interactive user interface and remote control; a 4K version was released in September 2020, followed by a 1080p version in September 2022.

Critics praised the first-generation Chromecast's simplicity and potential for future app support. The Google Cast SDK was released on February 3, 2014, allowing third parties to modify their software to work with Chromecast and other Cast receivers. By May 2015, more than 1.5 billion stream requests had been initiated and over 20,000 Cast-ready apps had been made available, according to Google. Chromecast was the best-selling streaming device in the United States in 2014, according to NPD Group. Over 100 million Chromecast devices were sold over 11 years, according to Google. Many technology publications included Chromecast on their lists of popular and influential products of the 2010s. In 2024, the Chromecast product line was discontinued and replaced with the Google TV Streamer.

== Development ==
The Chromecast was originally conceived by engineer Majd Bakar. His inspiration for the product came around 2008 after noticing the film-viewing tendencies of his wife Carla Hindie. Using her laptop, she would search for a film to watch on a streaming service and add it to her queue, before closing her laptop and using a gaming device to play the film on a television. She took these steps because she found television interfaces difficult to use when searching for content. Rishi Chandra, who previously headed up development of the Google TV operating system, had similar experiences at home, as his wife watched YouTube videos in their living room on a laptop rather than on a television because she found it "too much of a pain" to play videos on their television. Bakar found the whole process inefficient and wanted to build a phone-based interface that would allow video to play on a large display through a small hardware device.

After joining Google in 2011 to work on products that "would change how people used their TVs", Bakar pitched the idea for the Chromecast. In 2012, a small team split off from the Google TV team to begin development of the Chromecast; Chandra described it as a "true kind of little mini startup inside of Google". At the time, Google had limited experience manufacturing its own devices and was partnering with other companies for its Google Nexus line of devices. The Chromecast team subsequently enlisted an employee from Motorola, which Google had just acquired at the time, to coordinate manufacturing as a "20% time" side project. Google originally targeted an introductory price of US$25 for the Chromecast but had not accounted for factors such as certification testing and retailers' profit margins; the company ultimately settled on a US$35 price point for the first model. Late in 2012, Bakar brought home a beta version of the product for Hindie to test. The device was launched in July 2013.

According to a complaint filed against Google as part of a patent lawsuit, Google employees reportedly held several meetings with the company Touchstream in December 2011 to discuss its casting technology. However, Google later conveyed that it was not interested in Touchstream's technology. About 18 months later, Google introduced its Chromecast media-streaming devices, which were allegedly based on the technology demonstrated during those earlier meetings.

== Features and operation ==
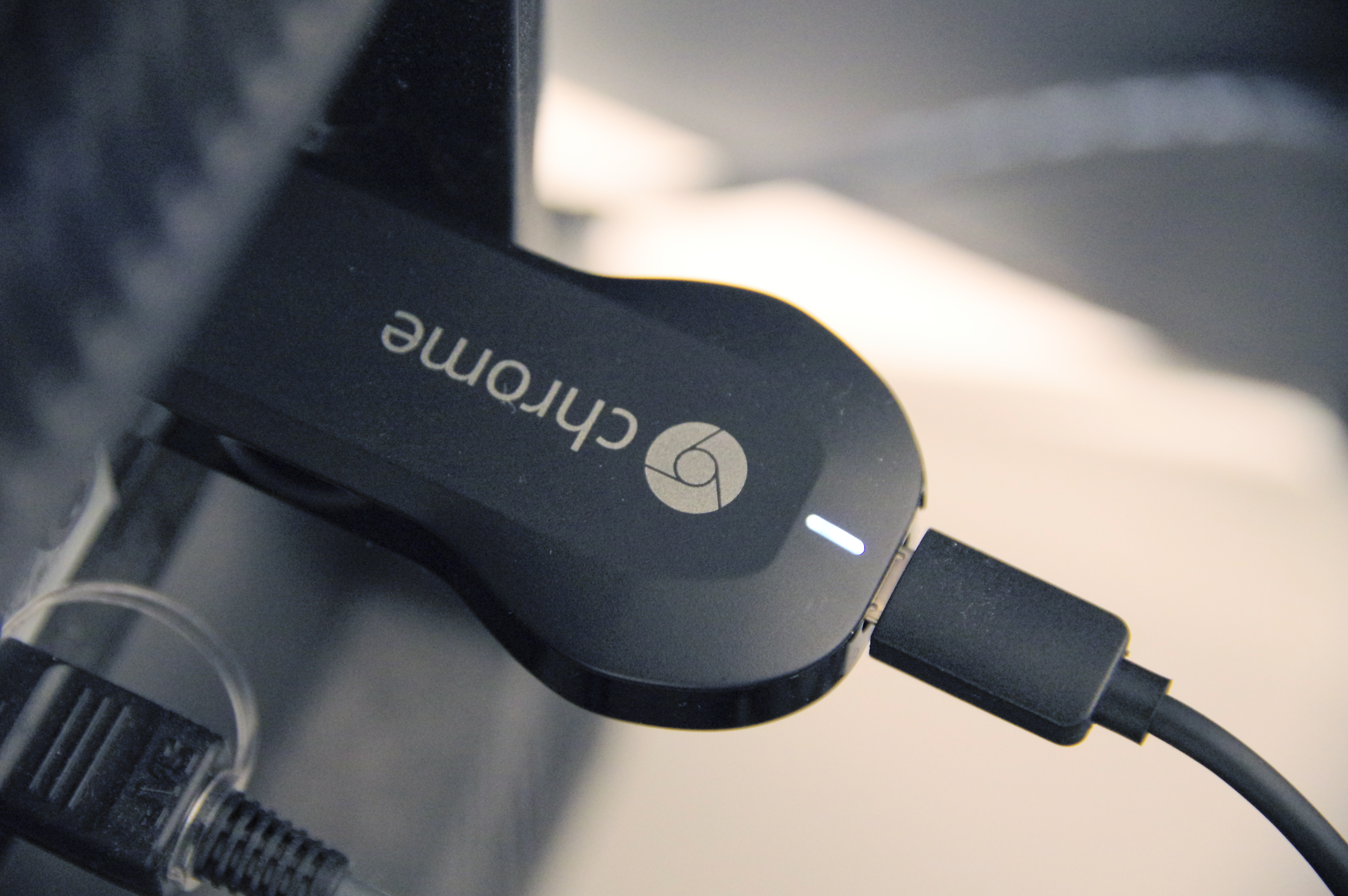
A first-generation Chromecast plugged into the HDMI port of a TV

All Chromecast devices offer at least two methods to stream content: the first employs mobile and web apps that include the Google Cast technology; the second, which applies to video models, allows mirroring of content from the web browser Google Chrome running on a personal computer, as well as content displayed on some Android devices. In both cases, playback is initiated through the "cast" button on the sender device.

When no content is streamed, video-capable Chromecasts display a user-personalizable content feed called "Backdrop" that can include featured and personal photos, artwork, weather, satellite images, weather forecasts, and news.

If a television's HDMI ports implement the Consumer Electronics Control (CEC) feature, pressing the cast button will also result in the video-capable Chromecast automatically turning on the TV and switching the television's active audio/video input using the CEC command "One Touch Playback".

== Hardware and design ==
Chromecast devices are dongles that are powered by connecting the device to an external power adapter or USB port using a USB cable. Video-capable Chromecasts plug into the HDMI port of a high-definition television or monitor, while the audio-only model outputs sound through its integrated 3.5 millimeter audio jack/mini-TOSLINK socket. By default, Chromecasts connect to the Internet through a Wi-Fi connection to the user's local network. A standalone USB power supply with an Ethernet port allows for a wired Internet connection; the power adapter for early Chromecast models was first introduced in July 2015 for US$15, while the adapter for Chromecast with Google TV was released in October 2020 for US$20.

=== First generation ===
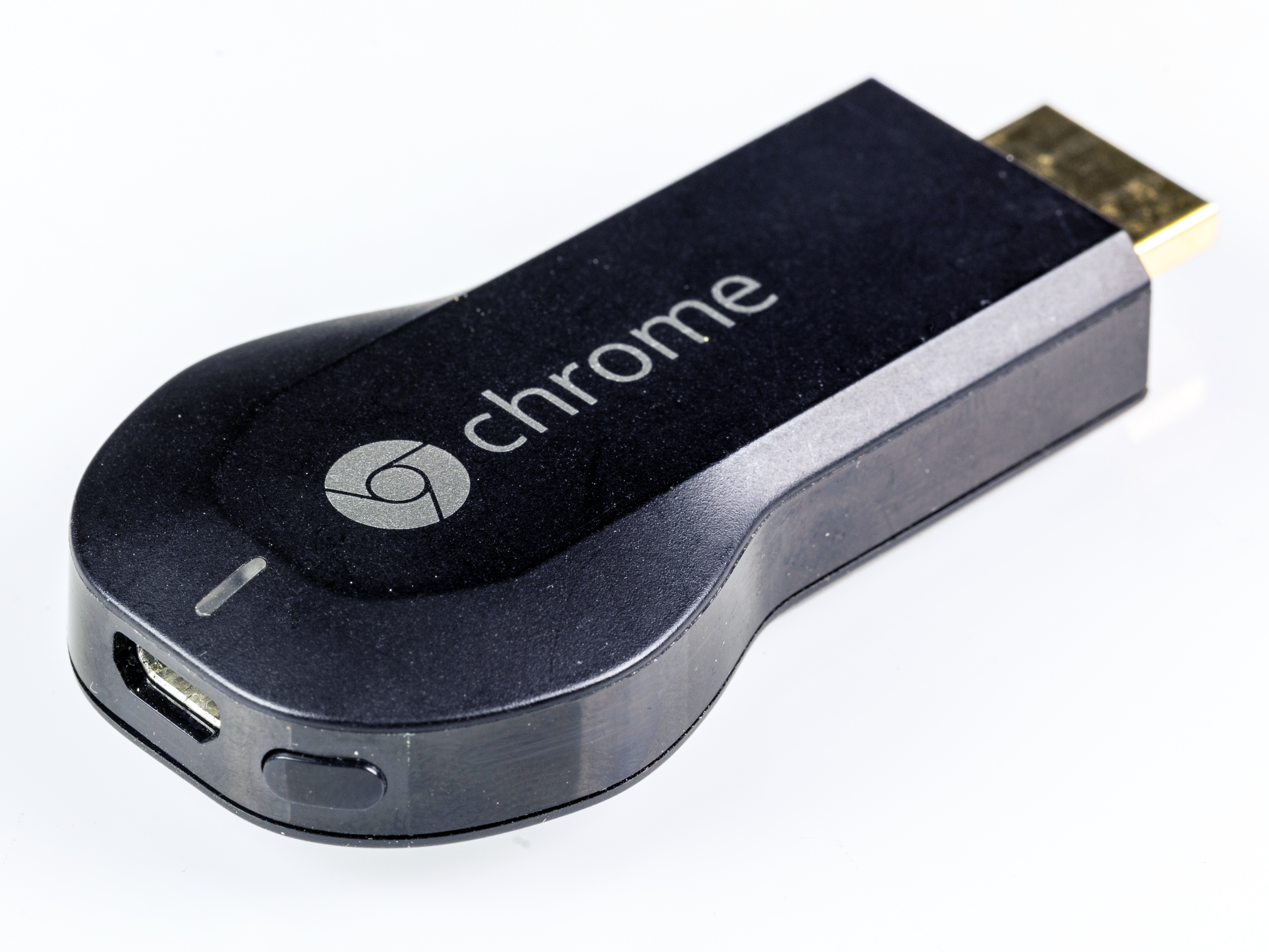
The first-generation video-capable Chromecast

The original Chromecast measures 2.83 inches (72 mm) in length and has an HDMI plug built into the body. It contains the Marvell Armada 1500-mini 88DE3005 system on a chip (SoC) running an ARM Cortex-A9 processor. The SoC includes codecs for hardware decoding of the VP8 and H.264 video compression formats. Radio communication is handled by AzureWave NH–387 Wi-Fi which implements 802.11 b/g/n (2.4 GHz). The device has 512 MB of Micron DDR3L RAM and 2 GB of flash storage.

The model number H2G2-42 is likely a reference to The Hitchhiker's Guide to the Galaxy abbreviation "H2G2"—in the novel, the number 42 is the "Answer to the Ultimate Question of Life, the Universe, and Everything." The bundled power adapter bears the model number MST3K-US, a reference to the television series Mystery Science Theater 3000.

=== Second generation ===
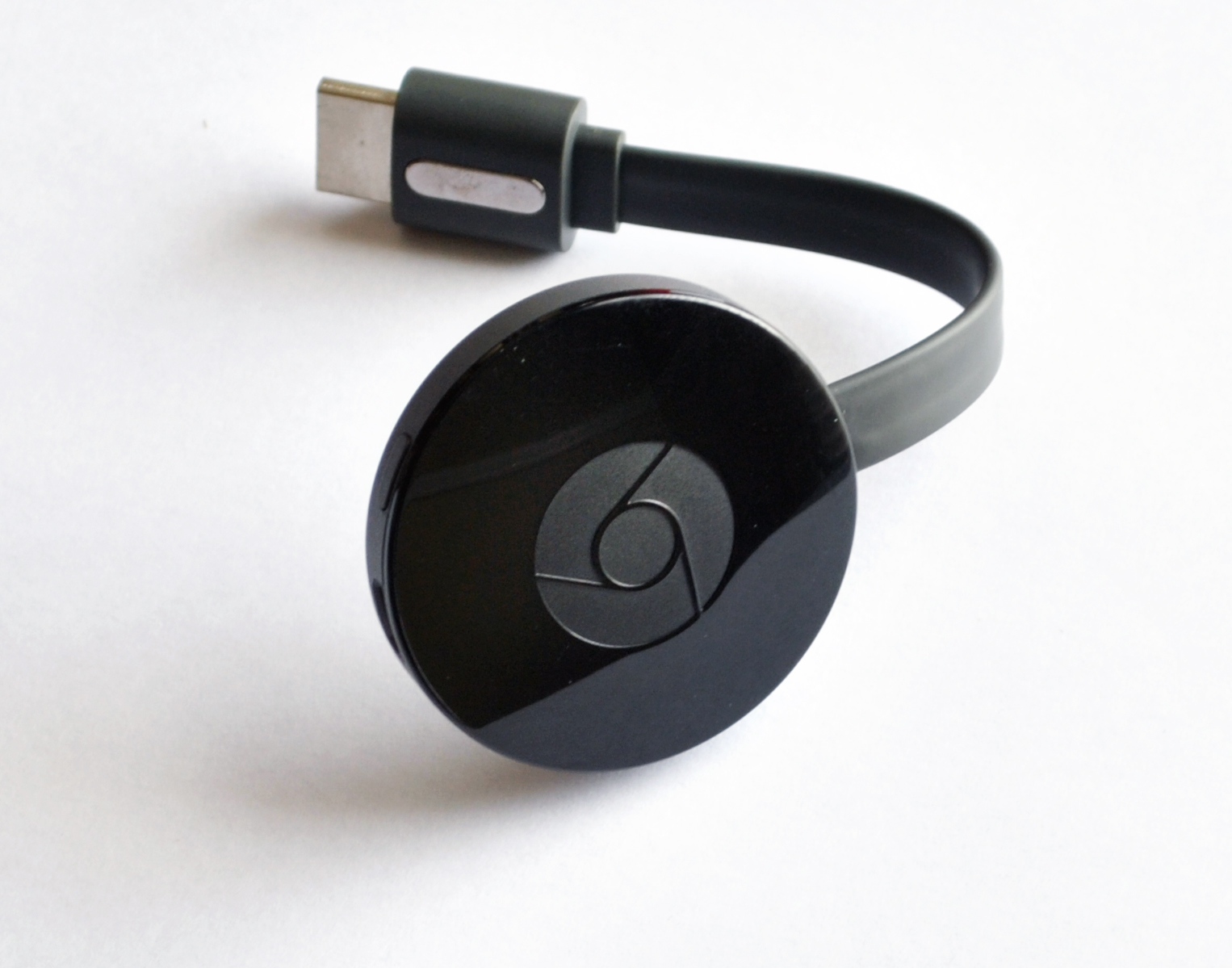
The second-generation video capable Chromecast

The second-generation Chromecast has a disc-shaped body with a short length of HDMI cable attached (as opposed to the HDMI plug built into the original model). The cable is flexible and the plug can magnetically attach to the device body for more positioning options behind a television. The second-generation model uses a Marvell Armada 1500 Mini Plus 88DE3006 SoC, which has dual ARM Cortex-A7 processors running at 1.2 GHz. The unit contains an Avastar 88W8887 radio chip, which has improved Wi-Fi performance and supports the 802.11 ac wireless protocol and 5 GHz band, while containing three adaptive antennas for better connections to home routers. The device contains 512 MB of Samsung DDR3L RAM and 256 MB of flash storage.

The model number NC2-6A5 may be a reference to the registry number "NCC-1701" of the fictional starship USS Enterprise from the Star Trek franchise, the "saucer section" of which the device resembles: NC^{2} can be read as NCC, and 6A5 converted from hexadecimal is 1701.

=== Chromecast Audio ===
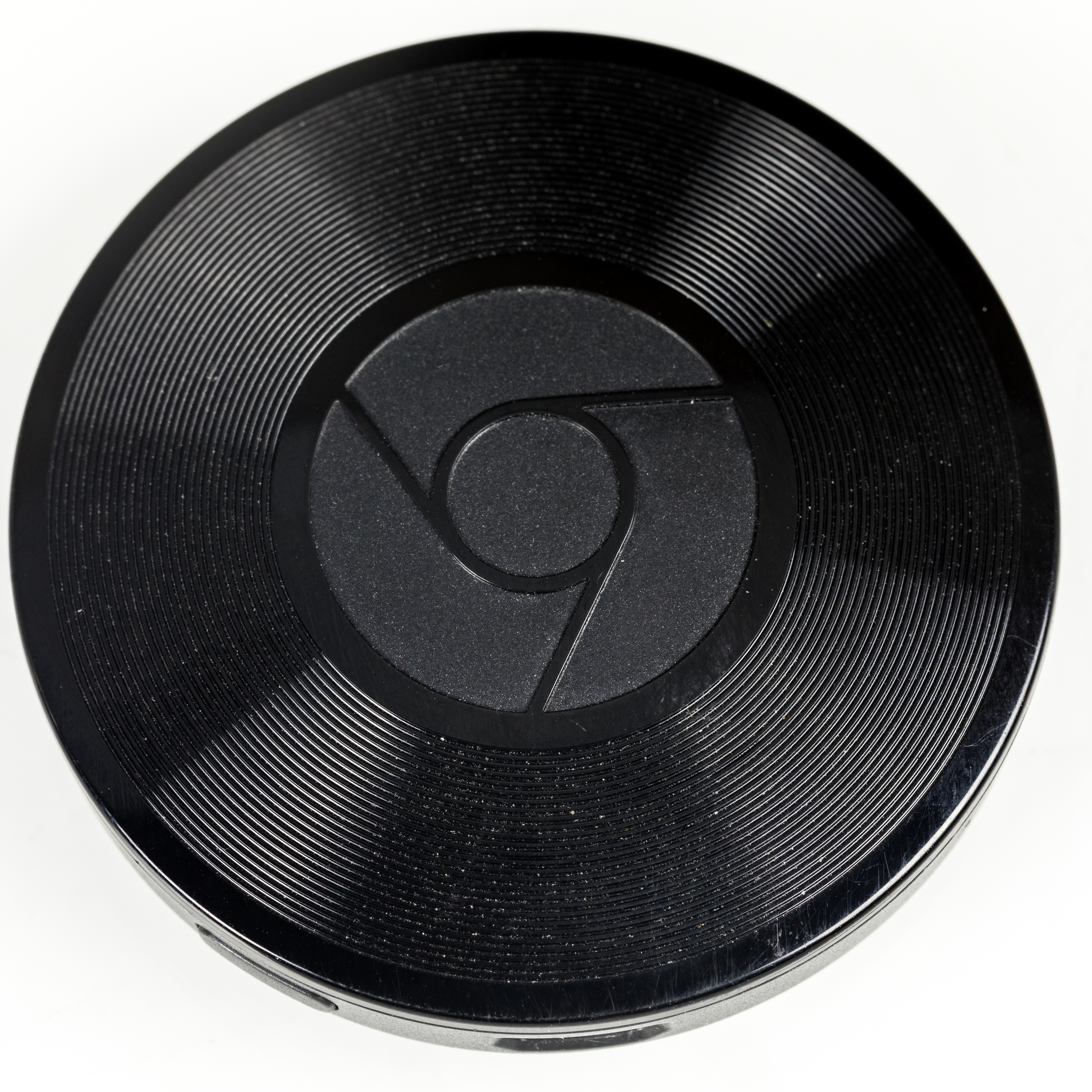
Chromecast Audio, without the 3.5 mm audio cable attached

Chromecast Audio is a variation of the second-generation Chromecast designed for use with audio streaming apps. Chromecast Audio features a 3.5 mm (0.14 in) audio jack/mini-TOSLINK socket, allowing the device to be attached to speakers and home audio systems. One side of the device is inscribed with circular grooves, resembling those of a vinyl record. A December 2015 update introduced support for high-resolution audio (24-bit/96 kHz) and multi-room playback; users can simultaneously play audio across multiple Chromecast Audio devices in different locations by grouping them together using the Google Home mobile app. The feature made Chromecast Audio a low-cost alternative to Sonos' multiple-room music systems.

The model number RUX-J42 may have been a reference to the Jimi Hendrix albums Are You Experienced (stylized "R U eXperienced") and Midnight Lightning, which had the internal code J-42. Chromecast Audio was also developed with the internal codename Hendrix.

=== Chromecast Ultra ===
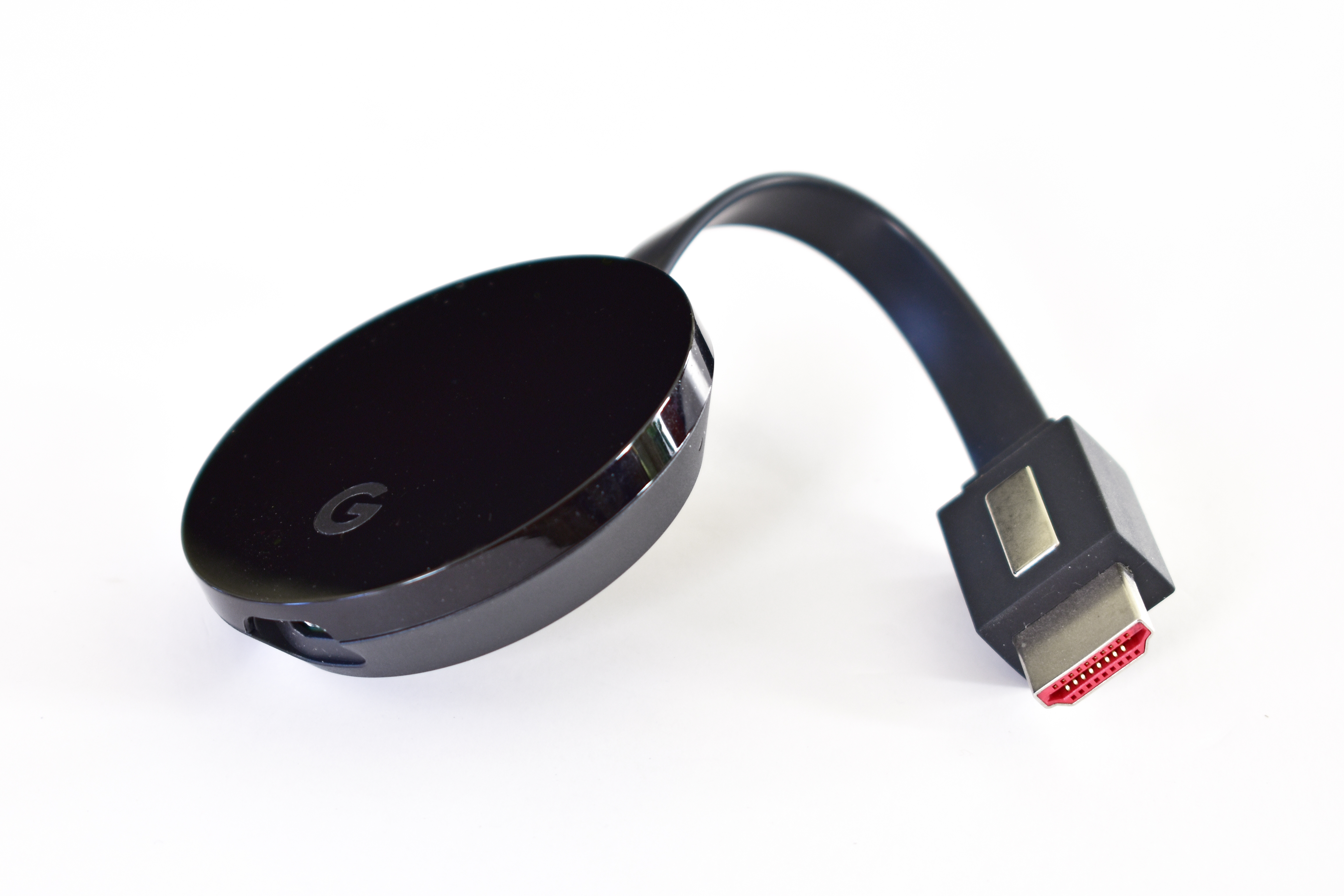
Chromecast Ultra

Chromecast Ultra is similar in design to the second-generation model, but features upgraded hardware that allows the streaming of 4K resolution content, as well as high-dynamic range (HDR) through the HDR10 and Dolby Vision formats. (The maximum resolution of the "Ambient" screensaver features is 1080p.) Google stated that the Chromecast Ultra loads video 1.8 times faster than previous models. Unlike previous models that could be powered through a USB port, the Chromecast Ultra requires the use of the included power supply for connecting to a wall outlet. The power supply also offers an Ethernet port for a wired connection to accommodate the fast network speeds needed to stream 4K content. The Chromecast Ultra was one of the first devices to work with Google's now discontinued cloud gaming service Stadia; a Chromecast Ultra was included with a controller in the "Founder's Edition" and "Premiere Edition" bundles for Stadia.

=== Third generation ===
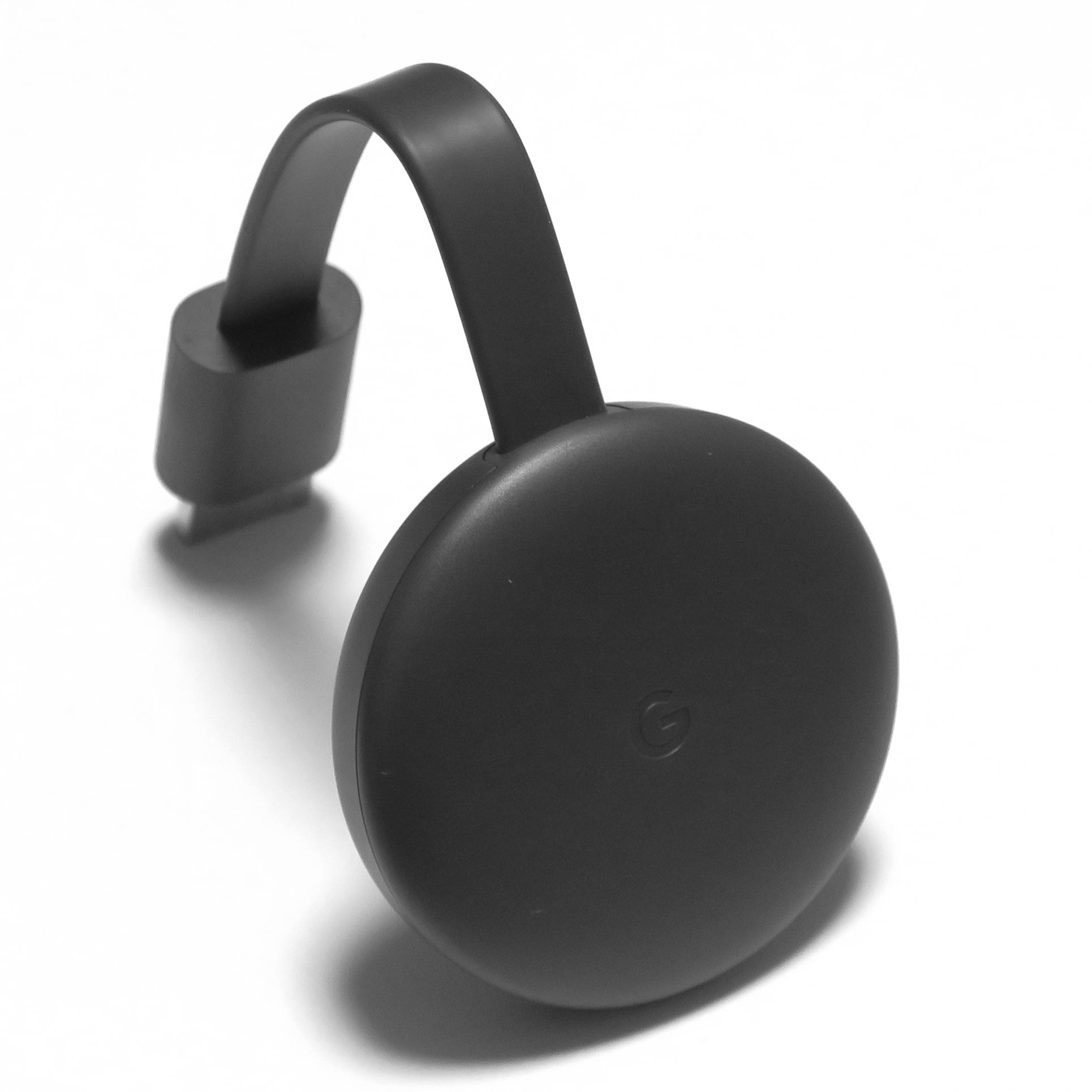
The third-generation Chromecast

The third-generation Chromecast added 60 frames-per-second playback capability at a resolution of 1080p, compared to the second-generation Chromecast's maximum of 720p at the same frame rate. Google said the third-generation Chromecast offered a 15 percent increase in speed over the second-generation model. The magnetic attachment between the dongle body and HDMI plug that was present on prior models was dropped for the third-generation device. The model contains Chromecast Audio technology, allowing it to be paired with other devices for multi-room synchronized playback.

=== Chromecast with Google TV ===
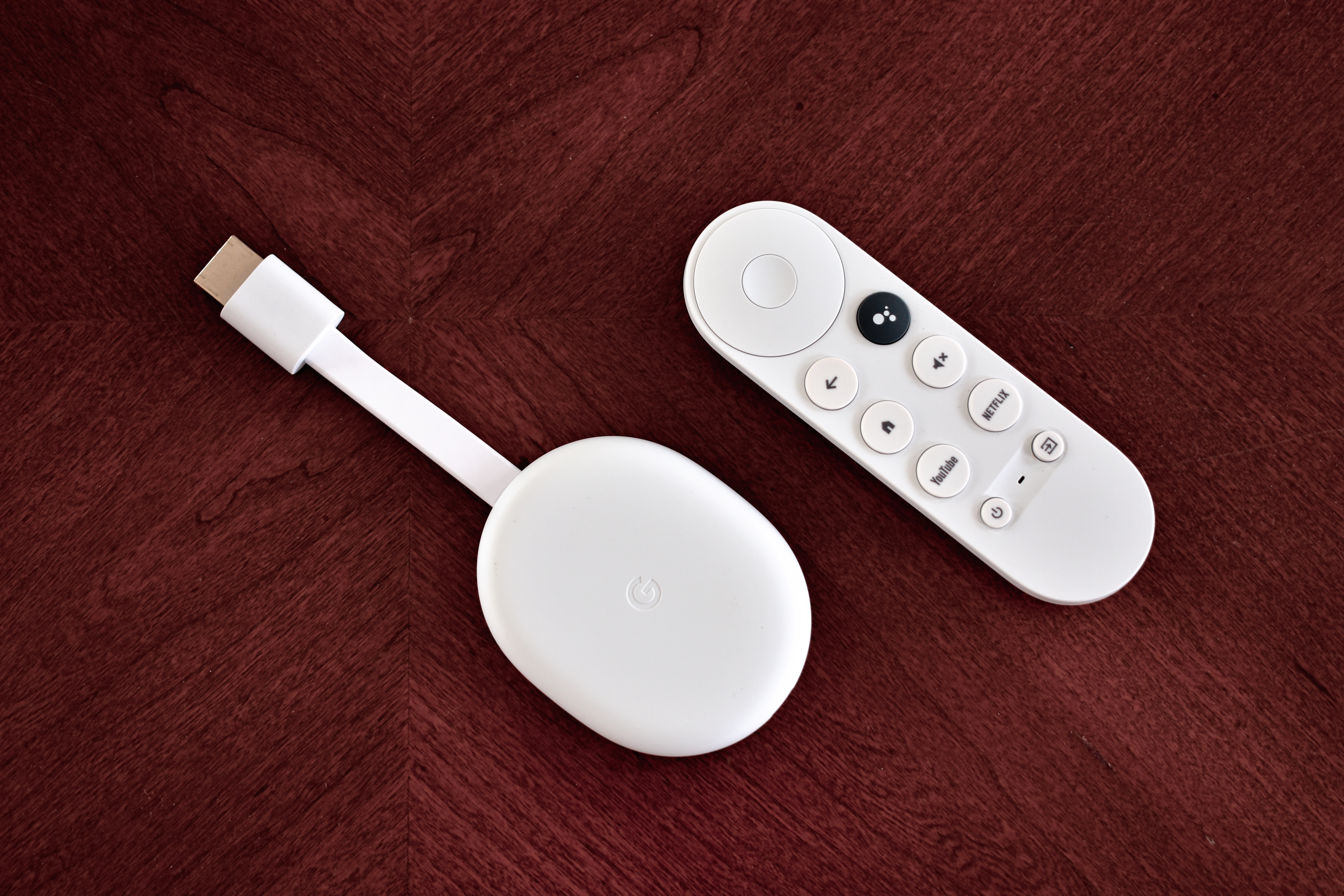
Chromecast with Google TV (4K model pictured) was the first device in the product line to have an on-screen user interface that can be navigated with a remote control.

Chromecast with Google TV is the fourth generation of the Chromecast product line, and comprises two models: one capable of up to 4K resolution video that was released in September 2020; and a cheaper "Chromecast with Google TV (HD)" model capable of up to 1080p resolution video that was released in September 2022. Unlike prior models, Chromecasts with Google TV are bespoke digital media players based on the Android TV operating system, with the then-new Google TV user interface that offers content discovery and search across various media services. Like previous models, Chromecasts with Google TV allow content to be cast to them from other devices.

Chromecasts with Google TV are bundled with a Bluetooth remote control, which has dedicated buttons for opening YouTube and Netflix, as well as a Google Assistant button for initiating voice commands or search queries through the remote's microphone. The remote can be programmed to control the power, volume, and input functions of televisions and soundbars through HDMI-CEC or infrared signals. Unlike some previous models that could be powered by a television's USB port, Chromecasts with Google TV require a power adapter, which connects via USB-C.

The 4K model shipped with Android 10 and was later upgradeable to Android 12 through a downloadable update. It supports HDR through the Dolby Vision, HDR10, and HDR10+ formats, while also supporting the Dolby Digital, Dolby Digital Plus, and Dolby Atmos audio formats. It contains 8 GB of internal storage, 2 GB of RAM, and an Amlogic S905D3 SoC. The 4K model and its remote were produced in three different colors: Snow, Sky, and Sunrise.

The HD model shipped with Android 12. Like the 4K model, it included 8 GB of internal storage, but many other technical specifications were reduced. The HD version contains 1.5 GB of RAM and a less powerful Amlogic S805X2 chipset. It includes a hardware AV1 decoder, which was not in the 4K model. The HD model and its remote were only produced in the Snow color.

=== Model comparison ===
Model	Chromecast (1st generation)	Chromecast (2nd generation)	Chromecast Audio	Chromecast Ultra	Chromecast (3rd generation)	Chromecast with Google TV (4K) (4th generation)	Chromecast with Google TV (HD) (4th generation)
Model Number	H2G2-42	NC2-6A5	RUX-J42	NC2-6A5-D GA3A00403A14	NC2-6A5B GA00439	GZRNL/G9N9N GA01919	G454V/G9N9N GA03131
Release date	July 24, 2013	September 29, 2015	September 29, 2015	November 6, 2016	October 10, 2018	September 30, 2020	September 22, 2022
Sales discontinued	September 29, 2015	October 10, 2018	January 11, 2019	September 30, 2020	September 22, 2022	February 21, 2025 (Note: Sales were discontinued in the United States, but the device remains available for sale in other regions.)	February 21, 2025
Launch price	US$35	US$35	US$35	US$69	US$35	US$49.99	US$29.99
Operating system based on	Chromecast firmware (simplified version of Chrome OS)	Chromecast firmware (simplified version of Chrome OS)	Chromecast firmware (based on Chrome OS)	Chromecast firmware (based on Chrome OS)	Chromecast firmware (based on Chrome OS)	Android TV	Android TV
System on a chip	Marvell Armada 1500 Mini 88DE3005-A1	Marvell Armada 1500 Mini Plus 88DE3006	Marvell Armada 1500 Mini Plus 88DE3006 (1.2 GHz dual-core ARM Cortex-A7)	Marvell Armada 1500 Mini Plus (1.2 GHz dual-core ARM Cortex-A53)	Synaptics MM3006A0 (Marvell 88DE3006)	Amlogic S905D3 (1.9 GHz quad-core ARM Cortex-A55) and Mali-G31 MP2 GPU	Amlogic S805X2 (quad-core ARM Cortex-A35)
Memory	512 MB DDR3L	512 MB DDR3L	256 MB DDR3L	1 GB DDR3L	512 MB DDR3L	2 GB DDR3L	1.5 GB DDR3L
Storage	2 GB	256 MB	256 MB	2 GB	512 MB	8 GB	8 GB
Display	1080p @ 30fps or 720p @ 60fps	1080p @ 30fps or 720p @ 60fps	—N/a	4K Ultra HD; High dynamic range (HDR10, Dolby Vision)	1080p @ 60fps	4K Ultra HD @ 60fps; High dynamic range (HDR10, HDR10+, Dolby Vision, HLG)	1080p HDR @ 60fps; High dynamic range (HDR10, HDR10+, HLG)
Software and Security Support	Ended in May 2023	Supported	Supported	Supported	Supported	Supported	Supported
Audio DAC	—N/a	—N/a	AKM AK4430 192 kHz 24-Bit DAC	—N/a	—N/a	—N/a	—N/a
Remote control	—N/a	—N/a	—N/a	—N/a	—N/a	Included	Included
Connectivity	HDMI (can use CEC); Wi-Fi (802.11 b/g/n @ 2.4 GHz); Ethernet (with Ethernet power adapter)	HDMI (can use CEC); Wi-Fi (802.11 b/g/n/ac @ 2.4/5 GHz); Ethernet (with Ethernet power adapter)	Combined 3.5 mm audio jack and mini-TOSLINK socket; Wi-Fi (802.11 b/g/n/ac @ 2.4/5 GHz); Ethernet (with Ethernet power adapter)	HDMI (can use CEC); Wi-Fi (802.11 b/g/n/ac @ 2.4/5 GHz); Ethernet (with included Ethernet power adapter)	HDMI (can use CEC); Wi-Fi (802.11 b/g/n/ac @ 2.4/5 GHz); Ethernet (with Ethernet power adapter)	HDMI (can use CEC); Wi-Fi (802.11 b/g/n/ac @ 2.4/5 GHz); Bluetooth 4.2; Ethernet (with Ethernet power adapter)	HDMI (can use CEC); Wi-Fi (802.11 b/g/n/ac @ 2.4/5 GHz); Bluetooth 4.2; Ethernet (with Ethernet power adapter)
Power	Micro-USB (USB port or power adapter)	Micro-USB (USB port or power adapter)	Micro-USB (USB port or power adapter)	Micro-USB (power adapter required)	Micro-USB (USB port or power adapter)	USB-C (power adapter required)	USB-C (power adapter required)
Dimensions	72 mm × 35 mm × 12 mm (2.83 in × 1.38 in × 0.47 in)	51.9 mm × 51.9 mm × 13.49 mm (2.04 in × 2.04 in × 0.53 in)	51.9 mm × 51.9 mm × 13.49 mm (2.04 in × 2.04 in × 0.53 in)	58.2 mm × 58.2 mm × 13.70 mm (2.29 in × 2.29 in × 0.54 in)	51.81 mm × 51.81 mm × 13.8 mm (2.04 in × 2.04 in × 0.54 in)	162 mm × 61 mm × 12.5 mm (6.38 in × 2.40 in × 0.49 in)	162.5 mm × 61 mm × 12.5 mm (6.40 in × 2.40 in × 0.49 in)
Weight	34 g (1.20 oz)	39.1 g (1.38 oz)	30.7 g (1.08 oz)	47 g (1.66 oz)	40 g (1.4 oz)	56.7 g (2.00 oz)	55 g (1.9 oz)

== Software ==
=== Google Cast SDK and compatible apps ===
Icon for the "cast button", which is used to connect, control and disconnect from Google Cast receivers. The button can also represent compatible non-Cast receivers, such as Bluetooth audio players.

At the time of Chromecast's launch, four compatible apps were available: YouTube and Netflix were supported as Android, iOS, and Chrome web apps; Google Play Music and Google Play Movies & TV were also supported, but originally only as Android apps. Additional Chromecast-enabled apps would require access to the Google Cast software development kit (SDK). The SDK was first released as a preview version on July 24, 2013. Google advised interested developers to use the SDK to create and test Chromecast-enabled apps, but not distribute them. While that admonition remained in force, Chromecast-enabled applications for Hulu Plus and Pandora Radio were released in October 2013, and HBO Go in November. Google opened the SDK to all developers on February 3, 2014. In its introductory documentation and video presentation, Google said the SDK worked with both Chromecast devices and other unnamed "cast receiver devices". Chromecast product manager Rish Chandra said that Google used the intervening time to improve the SDK's reliability and accommodate those developers who sought a quick and easy way to cast a photo to a television without a lot of coding.

Over time, many more applications have been updated to support Chromecast. At Google I/O 2014, the company announced that 6,000 registered developers were working on 10,000 Google Cast–ready apps; by the following year's conference, the number of compatible apps had doubled. Google has published case studies documenting Chromecast integration by Comedy Central, Just Dance Now, Haystack News and Fitnet.

In July 2019, the Amazon Prime Video apps for Android and iOS added Chromecast support, marking the first time Amazon's streaming service supported the device. The move followed a four-year dispute between Google and Amazon in which Amazon stopped selling Chromecast devices and Google pulled YouTube from Amazon Fire TV.

The development framework has two components: a sender app based on a vendor's existing Android or iOS mobile app or desktop web app, which provides users with content discovery and media controls; and a receiver app, executing in a Chrome browser-like environment resident on the cast receiver device. Both make use of APIs provided by the SDK.

=== Device discovery protocols ===
Chromecast uses the multicast Domain Name System (mDNS) protocol to search for available devices on a Wi-Fi network. Chromecast previously used the Discovery and Launch (DIAL) protocol, which was co-developed by Netflix and YouTube.

=== Operating system ===
At the introductory press conference, Mario Queiroz, Google's VP of Product Management, said that the first-generation Chromecast ran "a simplified version of ChromeOS". Subsequently, a team of hackers reported that the device is "more Android than ChromeOS" and appears to be adapted from software that was embedded in the since-discontinued Google TV platform. As with ChromeOS devices, Chromecast operating system updates are downloaded automatically without notification.

Differing from all previous models, the Chromecast with Google TV models run on the Android TV operating system. A modified user interface, branded "Google TV" (unrelated to Google's discontinued smart TV platform), replaced the stock interface of Android TV. The Google TV interface emphasizes content recommendations and discovery across different services and installed apps, compared to the stock Android TV interface that is more focused on navigating between individual installed apps. When the Chromecast with Google TV launched, the Google TV interface was compatible with over 6,500 apps built for Android TV, and over 30 streaming services were integrated with Google TV for use in its content aggregation features.

=== Mobile app ===
Chromecast is managed through the Google Home app, which enables users to set up new devices and configure existing ones (such as specifying which "Ambient Mode" images are shown when no other content is cast). The app manages other Google Cast–supported devices, including the Google Home smart speaker.

Originally called simply "Chromecast", the app was released concurrently with the original Chromecast video model and made available for both Android and iOS mobile devices. The app was released outside the US in October 2013.

In May 2016, the Chromecast app was renamed Google Cast due to the proliferation of non-Chromecast products that support casting. In October 2016, the Google Cast app was renamed Google Home, the name also given to the company's smart speaker—leaving "Google Cast" as the name of the technology.

== Release and promotion ==
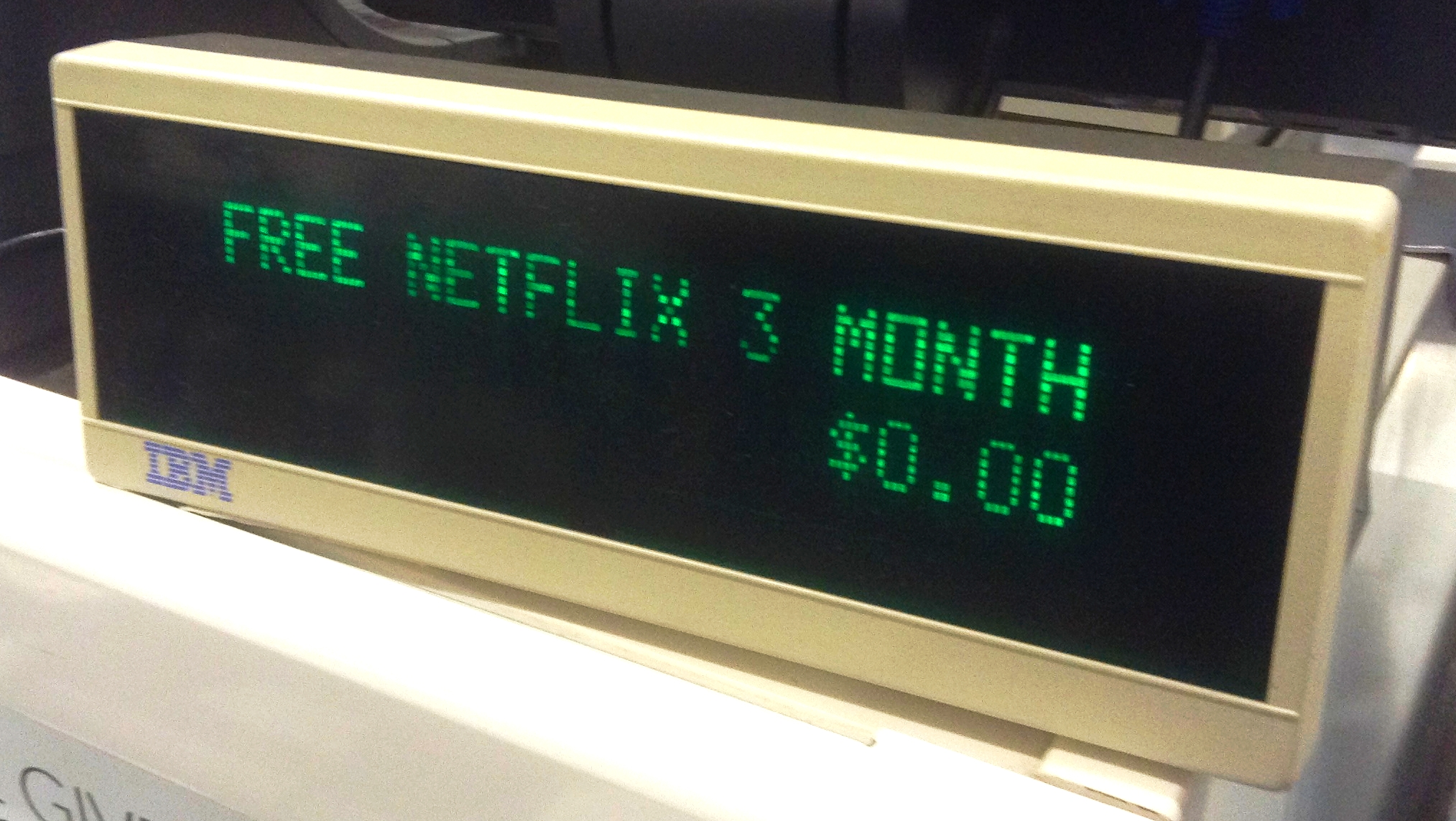
The first-generation Chromecast featured a limited promotion that included 3 months of Netflix at no cost.

Google made the first-generation Chromecast available for purchase online in the US on July 24, 2013. To entice consumers, Google initially included a promotion for three months of access to Netflix at no cost with the purchase of a Chromecast; the cost of a streaming-only plan on the service at that time was US$8 per month. The device quickly sold out on Amazon.com, BestBuy.com, and Google Play, and within 24 hours the Netflix promotion was ended because of high demand. On March 18, 2014, Google released the Chromecast to 11 new markets, including the UK, Germany and Canada with the BBC iPlayer enabled for UK users.

In July 2014, to commemorate the first anniversary of the device's launch, Google announced it would offer their music streaming service, Google Play Music All Access, at no cost for 90 days to Chromecast owners who had not previously used All Access; the standard cost of the service at that time was US$9.99 per month. On December 10, 2014, Chromecast was launched in India through e-commerce marketplace Snapdeal in partnership with Bharti Airtel. That same month, Google offered a promotion whereby anyone purchasing a Chromecast from a participating retailer before December 21 would receive a US$20 credit for the Google Play Store. Google offered a US$6 credit to the Store for all Chromecast owners beginning on February 6, 2015.

On September 29, 2015, Google announced the second-generation Chromecast and an audio-only model called Chromecast Audio. Each model was made available for purchase the same day for US$35. Days later, Amazon.com announced that it would ban the sale of Chromecast and Apple TV devices, presumably because they competed with Amazon's own Fire TV and Fire TV Stick. Google discontinued Chromecast Audio in January 2019.

On September 30, 2020, Google announced the Chromecast with Google TV during its "Launch Night In" event, though the product was already sold early at some retailers such as Walmart and the Home Depot during the week prior to its announcement. Google offered a promotion whereby anyone who signed up for YouTube TV and paid for one month of the service (a US$65 cost) would receive a Chromecast with Google TV at no cost; the offer was available only in the US to first-time YouTube TV subscribers. Additionally, in December 2020, Google made an offer available to YouTube TV users who had been continuous subscribers since June 2018 that allowed them to redeem a Chromecast with Google TV at no cost.

== Reception ==
=== First generation model ===
The first-generation Chromecast

Nilay Patel of The Verge gave the Chromecast an 8.5/10 score in his review, saying, "The Chromecast is basically an impulse purchase that just happens to be the simplest, cheapest, and best solution for getting a browser window on your TV." Speaking of the adapter's potential, he said, "it seems like the Chromecast might actually deliver on all that potential, but Google still has a lot of work to do." In particular, Patel pointed to Apple's AirPlay protocol as an example of an established competitor with many more features. TechCrunch's review of the device said, "Even with a bug or two rearing its head, the Chromecast is easily worth its $35 pricetag." Gizmodo gave the device a positive review, highlighting the ease of setup and sharing video. In comparing the device to competitors, the review said, "Chromecast isn't Google's version of Apple TV, and it's not trying to be... But Chromecast also costs a third of what those devices do, and has plenty of potential given that its SDK is just a few days old."

Michael Gorman of Engadget gave the Chromecast an 84/100 score, writing, "it's a platform that's likely to improve dramatically as more apps start to support the technology." In his comparing the Chromecast to competing devices, Gorman illustrated that it initially had support from fewer multimedia services, but because of its low price and ease of use, he concluded "we can wholeheartedly recommend the Chromecast for anyone who's been looking for an easy, unobtrusive way to put some brains into their dumb TV." Will Greenwald of PC Magazine rated it 4/5, saying, "The Google Chromecast is the least expensive way to access online services on your HDTV", although he noted that "The lack of local playback and limited Chrome integration holds it back in some respects." David Pogue of The New York Times praised the device for its $35 retail price, saying, "It's already a fine price for what this gadget does, and it will seem better and better the more video apps are made to work with it." Pogue noted the limitations of the device's screen mirroring feature and said using only mobile devices as a remote control was not "especially graceful", but he called Chromecast the "smallest, cheapest, simplest way yet to add Internet to your TV".

=== Second generation model ===
Nicole Lee of Engadget rated the second generation Chromecast an 85/100, highlighting the added support for 802.11ac and dual-band Wi-Fi networks and the usefulness of the updated Chromecast mobile app for finding content to cast. She said of the device, "No, it's not that much better than the original, but it still delivers great bang for your buck." David Katzmaier of CNET gave it a 7.9/10 score, calling the new hardware design more practical and praising the Chromecast app's search capabilities. He ultimately preferred other streaming devices with dedicated remotes over the Chromecast for everyday use, but said "for parties, travel and temporary connections, it's worth having a Chromecast in your arsenal".

=== Third generation model ===
In the face of stronger competition from devices such as the Apple TV, Roku or Fire TV, reviewers started to consider the 2018 Chromecast a secondary streaming device. Trusted Reviews considered it a "very minor" upgrade. Tom's Guide said it has almost "nothing to show" to reflect three years of hardware advancement in the streaming space.

=== Chromecast with Google TV ===
Chris Welch of The Verge gave the Chromecast with Google TV an 8.5/10 score, calling it a "big success" that "checks off almost everything important" for a streaming device. Welch praised the remote control and the Google TV interface's emphasis on content discovery, while noting some occasional sluggish performance. He concluded that Google "reinvented the Chromecast as an excellent 4K streamer that's dramatically easier to use — turns out actual menus and a remote really do matter — without losing sight of what made the original great". Sam Rutherford of Gizmodo said the device "instantly catapulted Google to the front of the streaming dongle wars with a $50 device that's smarter and easier to use than pretty much anything else out there". He lauded the remote control and user interface of Google TV, saying that it "feels just a bit more curated, polished, and tweaked to make the process of jumping back into your favorite shows and movies (or discovering new ones) that much faster". Eli Blumenthal of CNET gave the device a 9/10 score and described it as "the search giant's best TV effort yet and one of the best streamers you can buy, period". He praised Google TV's content aggregation and called it an upgrade over the stock Android TV interface. Blumenthal also called the integration with Google Assistant the best part of the Chromecast, despite some quirks with search results for video content.

Nicole Lee of Engadget called it "not only the best Chromecast yet, but also one of the most value-packed streaming devices on the market". She complimented the remote control design and the Google TV interface for being "far easier to navigate" than the standard Android TV interface. She also opined that Google TV was better than Amazon's Fire TV at aggregating content from multiple services, and that Google Assistant was "smarter" than Amazon's Alexa for voice commands. Nick Pino of TechRadar rated the device four-and-a-half stars and called it "a revelation – it fixes something that wasn't broken, and improves a nearly perfect technology in a tangible way". He praised the hardware, video and audio format support, and the user interface's ease of use, calling it a "retooled streaming device that... offers a whole new experience that's more user-friendly for folks who are used to using a remote control and an easily navigable interface." Brian X. Chen of The New York Times was surprised by the number of privacy policies the user had to agree to and the number of permissions the user had to grant during the setup process, and he was disappointed with the recommendations given by Google TV.

== Sales and impact ==
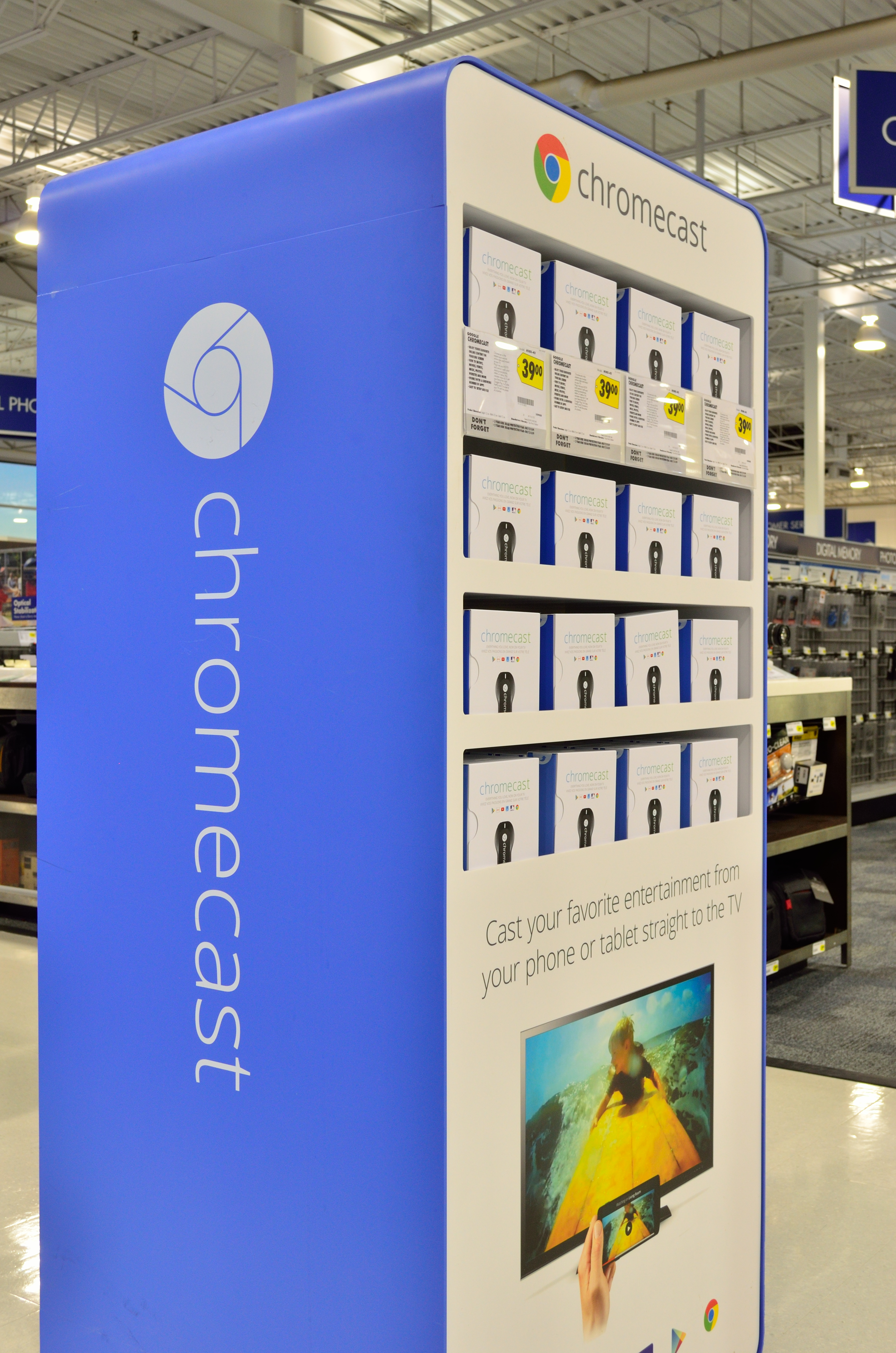
A retail display stand for Chromecast

In July 2014, Google announced that in the device's first year on sale, "millions" of units had sold and over 400 million casts had been made. The number of casts surpassed one billion by January 2015, and 1.5 billion by May 2015. The company confirmed that Chromecast was the best-selling media streaming device in the United States in 2014, according to NPD Group. In February 2015, Google Korea announced that about 10 million Chromecasts had been sold globally in 2014. At Google I/O in May 2015, the company announced 17 million units had sold since launch, a figure that reached 20 million by September 2015, 25 million by May 2016, and 30 million by July 2016. According to Strategy Analytics, Chromecast captured more than 35% of the digital streamer market internationally in 2015. By October 2017, over 55 million Chromecasts and Chromecast built-in devices have been sold. When announcing the end of the product line in August 2024, Google said that over 100 million Chromecasts had been sold.

Digital Trends named Chromecast the "Best Product of 2013". In March 2014, Engadget named Chromecast an Editor's Choice winner for "Home Theater Product of the Year" as part of the website's annual awards; for the following year's awards, the website named the device the winner of "Best in Home Entertainment".

In July 2015, Google signed a deal with the Television Academy to provide Chromecasts to Emmy Award voters to allow them to view screeners of nominated media. The multi-year agreement were intended to reduce the volume of DVD screeners distributed each year.

Chromecast appeared on several lists of technology from the 2010s. Time named it one of the 10 best gadgets of the decade, saying, "It might not be an essential piece of technology in the decade to come, but the Chromecast's influence on streaming media can't be understated." USA Today ranked Chromecast the 7th-best gadget of the 2010s. PC Magazine listed it as one of the "most iconic tech innovations" of the decade, saying, "Google made wireless streaming from mobile devices to the TV as simple as a few taps, all for $35." The Verge ranked it 39th on their list of the gadgets of the 2010s, saying that Chromecast "helped make streaming video a normal part of many households".

=== Security ===
On January 3, 2019, hackers took control of Chromecast devices, stating they were exposing security risks. The hackers claimed to access 70,000 devices through UPnP, a router setting that can make connected devices viewable to the public. The bug was dubbed CastHack, and was first found in 2014 by the security consultancy firm Bishop Fox and observed again in 2016.

=== Patent infringement ===
On July 24, 2023, a Texas jury found that Chromecast and other devices infringe patents owned by Touchstream Technologies related to streaming videos from one screen to another. The jury determined that Google violated the patents and must pay $338.7 million in damages.

== Discontinuation and successor ==
With the advent of Google Home smart speakers, Chromecast Audio became tangential to Google's product strategy and was discontinued in January 2019.

After 10 years of supporting the original Chromecast, Google ended software and security updates for the device in April 2023.

On August 6, 2024, Google announced that it was ending production of the Chromecast product line and that it would sell the devices until it exhausted existing inventory. The company said it would continue providing software and security updates for remaining devices. The same day, the company announced Google TV Streamer as its next media streaming device. The product has a sloped, wedge-shaped design and is meant to be placed in front of a television, eschewing the dongle form factor of Chromecasts that allows them to be hidden behind televisions. The Google TV Streamer features technical upgrades, including 32 GB of storage, 4 GB of memory, a 22-percent faster CPU, and an Ethernet port, along with new smart home capabilities such as a built-in Thread border router and support for the Matter standard. Contrasting with the entry-level price point of Chromecasts, the Google TV Streamer has a higher introductory price of US$99.

== See also ==
- Apple TV (device) – Home media streaming device from Apple
- Amazon Fire TV – Line of digital media players and microconsoles by Amazon
- Roku – Brand of streaming media players
- Stick PC – Computer plugged into an HDMI video port
- Comparison of digital media players
- Smart TV
