= AirPort =

Discontinued line of products by Apple Inc.

AirPort (Apple Inc.)

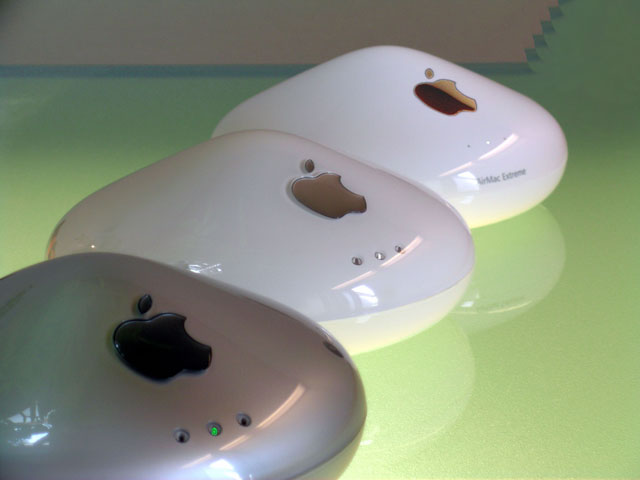
- First three AirPort Base Station models, including the AirPort Extreme to the right
- Developer: Apple Inc.
- Type: Wireless base stations and cards
- Released: 1999
- Discontinued: 2018

AirPort is a discontinued line of wireless routers and network cards developed by Apple Inc. using Wi-Fi protocols. In Japan, the line of products was marketed under the brand AirMac due to previous registration by I-O Data.

Apple introduced the AirPort line in 1999. Wireless cards were discontinued in 2009 following the Mac transition to Intel processors, after all of Apple's Mac products had adopted built-in Wi-Fi. Apple's line of wireless routers consisted of the AirPort Base Station (later AirPort Extreme); the AirPort Time Capsule, a variant with a built-in hard disk for automated backups; and the AirPort Express, a compact router.

In 2018, Apple discontinued the AirPort line. The remaining inventory was sold off, and Apple later sold routers from Linksys, Netgear, Amplifi and Eero in Apple retail stores.

== Overview ==
AirPort debuted in 1999, as "one more thing" at Macworld New York, with Steve Jobs surfing the web on an iBook using wireless internet technology for the very first time in a public demo of an Apple laptop. The initial offering consisted of an optional expansion card for Apple's new line of iBook notebooks and an AirPort Base Station. The AirPort card (a repackaged Lucent ORiNOCO Gold Card PC Card adapter) was later added as an option for almost all of Apple's product line, including PowerBooks, eMacs, iMacs, and Power Macs. Only Xserves did not have it as a standard or optional feature. The original AirPort system allowed transfer rates up to 11 Mbit/s and was commonly used to share Internet access and files between multiple computers.

In 2003, Apple introduced AirPort Extreme, based on the 802.11g specification, using Broadcom's BCM4306/BCM2050 two-chip solution. AirPort Extreme allows theoretical peak data transfer rates of up to 54 Mbit/s, and is fully backward-compatible with existing 802.11b wireless network cards and base stations. Several of Apple's desktop computers and portable computers, including the MacBook Pro, MacBook, Mac Mini, and iMac shipped with an AirPort Extreme (802.11g) card as standard. All other Macs of the time had an expansion slot for the card. AirPort and AirPort Extreme cards are not physically compatible: AirPort Extreme cards cannot be installed in older Macs, and AirPort cards cannot be installed in newer Macs. The original AirPort card was discontinued in June 2004.

In 2004, Apple released the AirPort Express base station as a "Swiss Army knife" multifunction product. It can be used as a portable travel router, using the same AC connectors as on Apple's AC adapters; as an audio streaming device, with both line-level and optical audio outputs; and as a USB printer sharing device, through its USB host port.

In 2007, Apple unveiled a new AirPort Extreme (802.11 Draft-N) Base Station, which introduced 802.11 Draft-N to the Apple AirPort product line. This implementation of 802.11 Draft-N can operate in both the 2.4 GHz and 5 GHz ISM bands, and has modes that make it compatible with 802.11b/g and 802.11a. The number of Ethernet ports was increased to four—one nominally for WAN, three for LAN, but all can be used in bridged mode. A USB port was included for printers and other USB devices. The Ethernet ports were later updated to Gigabit Ethernet on all ports. The styling is similar to that of the Mac Mini and Apple TV.

In January 2008, Apple introduced Time Capsule, an AirPort Extreme (802.11 Draft-N) with an internal hard drive. The device includes software to allow any computer running a reasonably recent version of Mac OS or Windows to access the disk as a shared volume. Macs running Mac OS X 10.5 and later, which includes the Time Machine feature, can use the Time Capsule as a wireless backup device, allowing automatic, untethered backups of the client computer. As an access point, the unit is otherwise equivalent to an AirPort Extreme (802.11 Draft-N), with four Gigabit Ethernet ports and a USB port for printer and disk sharing.

In March 2008, Apple released an updated AirPort Express Base Station with 802.11 Draft-N 2x2 radio. All other features (analog and digital optical audio out, single Ethernet port, USB port for printer sharing) remained the same. At the time, it was the least expensive ($99) device to handle both frequency bands (2.4 GHz and 5 GHz) in 2x2 802.11 Draft-N.

In March 2009, Apple unveiled AirPort Extreme and Time Capsule products with simultaneous dual-band 802.11 Draft-N radios. This allows full 802.11 Draft-N 2x2 communication in both 802.11 Draft-N bands at the same time.

In October 2009, Apple unveiled the updated AirPort Extreme and Time Capsule products with antenna improvements (the 5.8 GHz model).

In 2011, Apple unveiled an updated AirPort Extreme base station, referred to as AirPort Extreme 802.11n (5th Generation). The latest AirPort base stations and cards work with third-party base stations and wireless cards that conformed to the 802.11a, 802.11b, 802.11g, 802.11 Draft-N, and 802.11 Final-N networking standards. It was not uncommon to see wireless networks composed of several types of AirPort base station serving old and new Macintosh, Microsoft Windows, and Linux systems. Apple's software drivers for AirPort Extreme also supported some Broadcom and Atheros-based PCI Wireless adapters when fitted to Power Mac computers. Due to the developing nature of Draft-N hardware, there was no assurance that the new model would work with all 802.11 Draft-N routers and access devices from other manufacturers.

=== Discontinuation ===
In 2016, Bloomberg reported that Apple had disbanded its wireless router team. In 2018, Apple announced it was discontinuing all of its AirPort products and exiting the router market. Bloomberg noted that "Apple rarely discontinues product categories" and that its decision to leave the business was "a boon for other wireless router makers."

Overview of AirPort (AirMac)-branded products
| Family brand | Image | Functions | Introduced / Discontinued |
|---|---|---|---|
| Card | Card not Base Station | Adds wireless networking interface to Macintosh personal computers | 1999–2005 |
| Base Station | | Wireless networking switch and internet router | 1999–2003 |
| Extreme | | Wireless networking switch and internet router; USB print server. Later (square-shaped) versions added network-attached USB storage & backup. | 2003–2018 |
| Express | | Wireless networking switch, access point, bridge; internet router; USB print server; streaming audio receiver | 2004–2018 |
| Time Capsule | | Network-attached backup storage, wireless networking switch, and internet router | 2008–2018 |

== AirPort routers ==
Evolution of chipsets

An AirPort router is used to connect AirPort-enabled computers to the Internet, each other, a wired LAN, and/or other devices.

=== AirPort Base Station ===
AirPort Base Stations

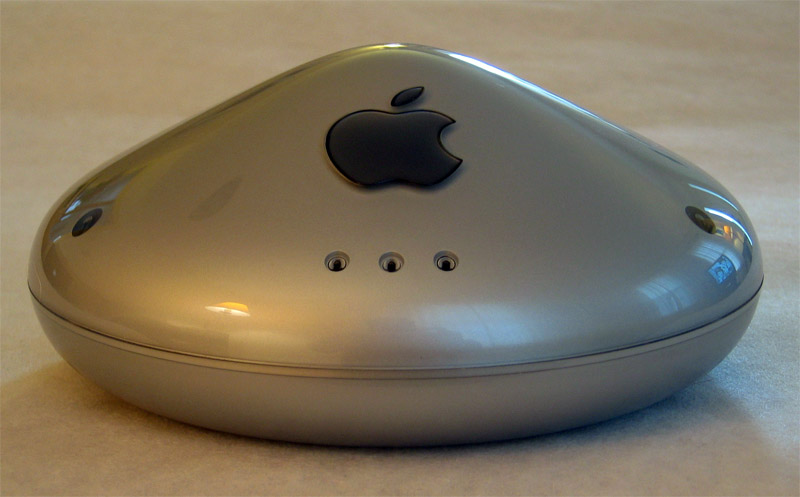
Original Graphite (1999)

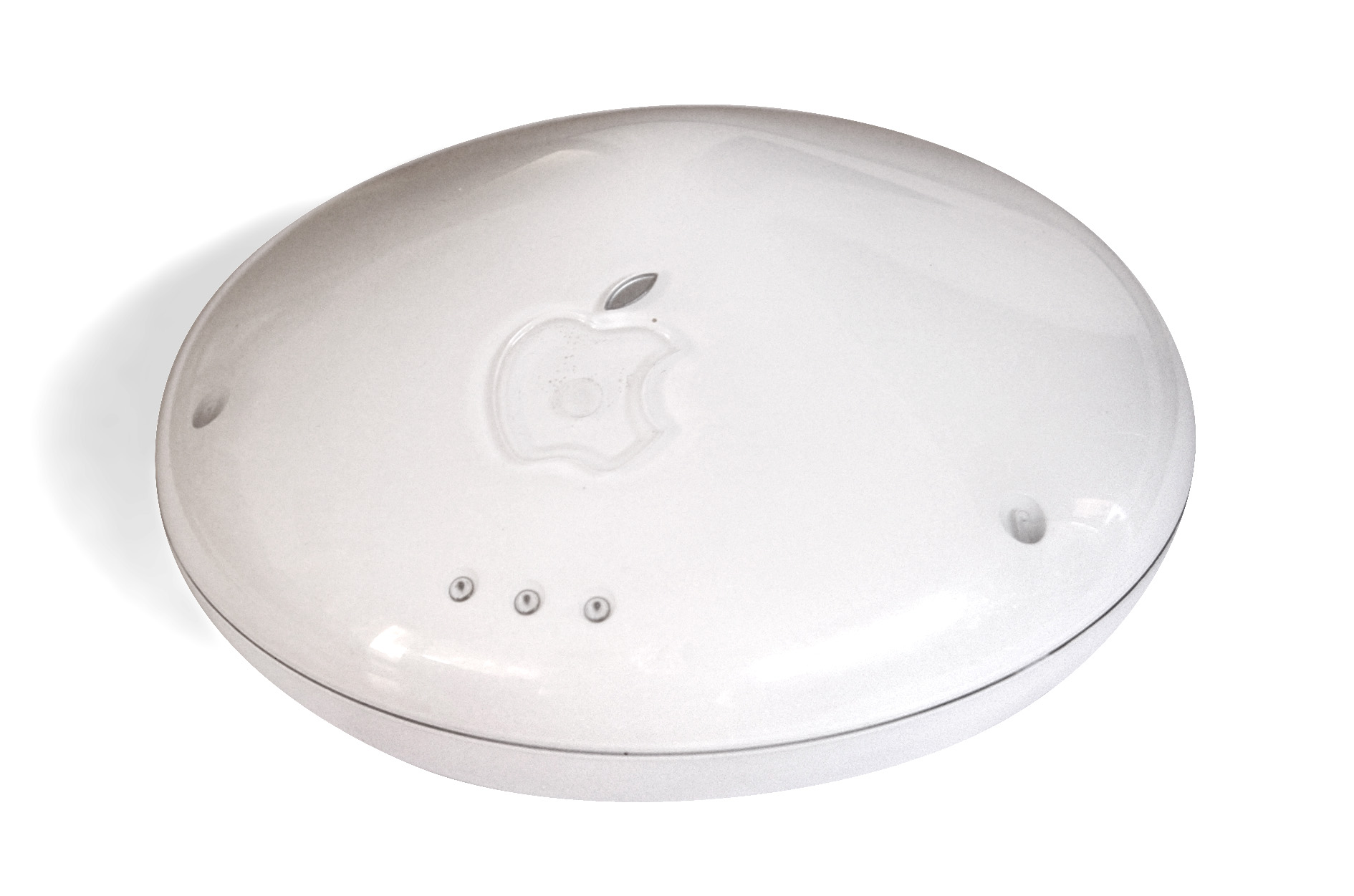
Snow (2001)

The original AirPort Base Station (known as Graphite, model M5757, part number M7601LL/B) features a dial-up modem and an Ethernet port. It employs a Lucent WaveLAN Silver PC Card as the Radio, and uses an embedded AMD Élan SC410 processor. It connects to the machine via the Ethernet port. It was released July 21, 1999. The Graphite AirPort Base Station is functionally identical to the Lucent RG-1000 wireless base station and can run the same firmware. Due to the original firmware-locked limitations of the Silver card, the unit can only accept 40-bit WEP encryption. Later aftermarket tweaks can enable 128-bit WEP on the Silver card. Aftermarket Linux firmware has been developed for these units to extend their useful service life.

A second-generation model (known as Dual Ethernet or Snow, model M8440, part number M8209LL/A) was introduced on November 13, 2001. It features a second Ethernet port when compared to the Graphite design, allowing for a shared Internet connection with both wired and wireless clients. Also new (but available for the original model via software update) was the ability to connect to and share America Online's dial-up service—a feature unique to Apple base stations. This model is based on Motorola's PowerPC 855 processor and contained a fully functional original AirPort Card, which can be removed and used in any compatible Macintosh computer.

=== AirPort Extreme Base Station ===
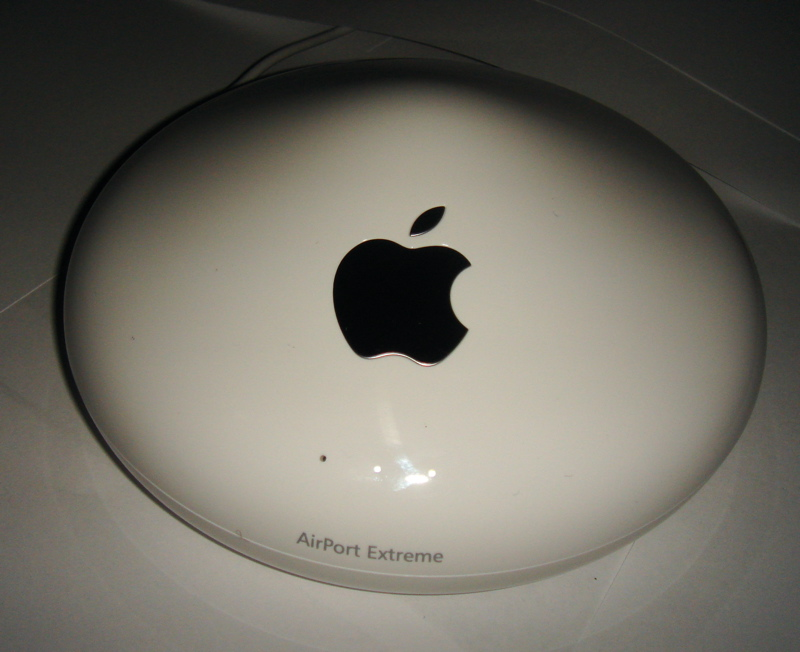
AirPort Extreme Base Station

Three different configurations of model A1034 are all called the "AirPort Extreme Base Station":
1. M8799LL/A – 2 Ethernet ports, 1 USB port, external antenna connector, 1 56k (V.90) modem port
2. M8930LL/A – 2 Ethernet ports, 1 USB port.
3. M9397LL/A – 2 Ethernet ports, 1 USB port, external antenna connector, powered over Ethernet cable (PoE/UL2043)

The AirPort Base Station was discontinued after the updated AirPort Extreme was announced on January 7, 2003. In addition to providing wireless connection speeds of up to a maximum of 54 Mbit/s, it adds an external antenna port and a USB port. The antenna port allows the addition of a signal-boosting antenna, and the USB port allows the sharing of a USB printer. A connected printer is made available via Bonjour's "zero configuration" technology and IPP to all wired and wireless clients on the network. The CPU is an AU1500-333MBC Alchemy (processor). A second model (M8930LL/A) lacking the modem and external antenna port was briefly made available, but then discontinued after the launch of AirPort Express (see below). On April 19, 2004, a third version, marketed as the AirPort Extreme Base Station (with Power over Ethernet and UL 2043), was introduced that supports Power over Ethernet and complies to the UL 2043 specifications for safe usage in air handling spaces, such as above suspended ceilings. All three models support the Wireless Distribution System (WDS) standard. The model introduced in January 2007 does not have a corresponding PoE, UL-compliant variant.

An AirPort Extreme base station can serve a maximum of 50 wireless clients simultaneously.

=== AirPort Extreme 802.11n ===
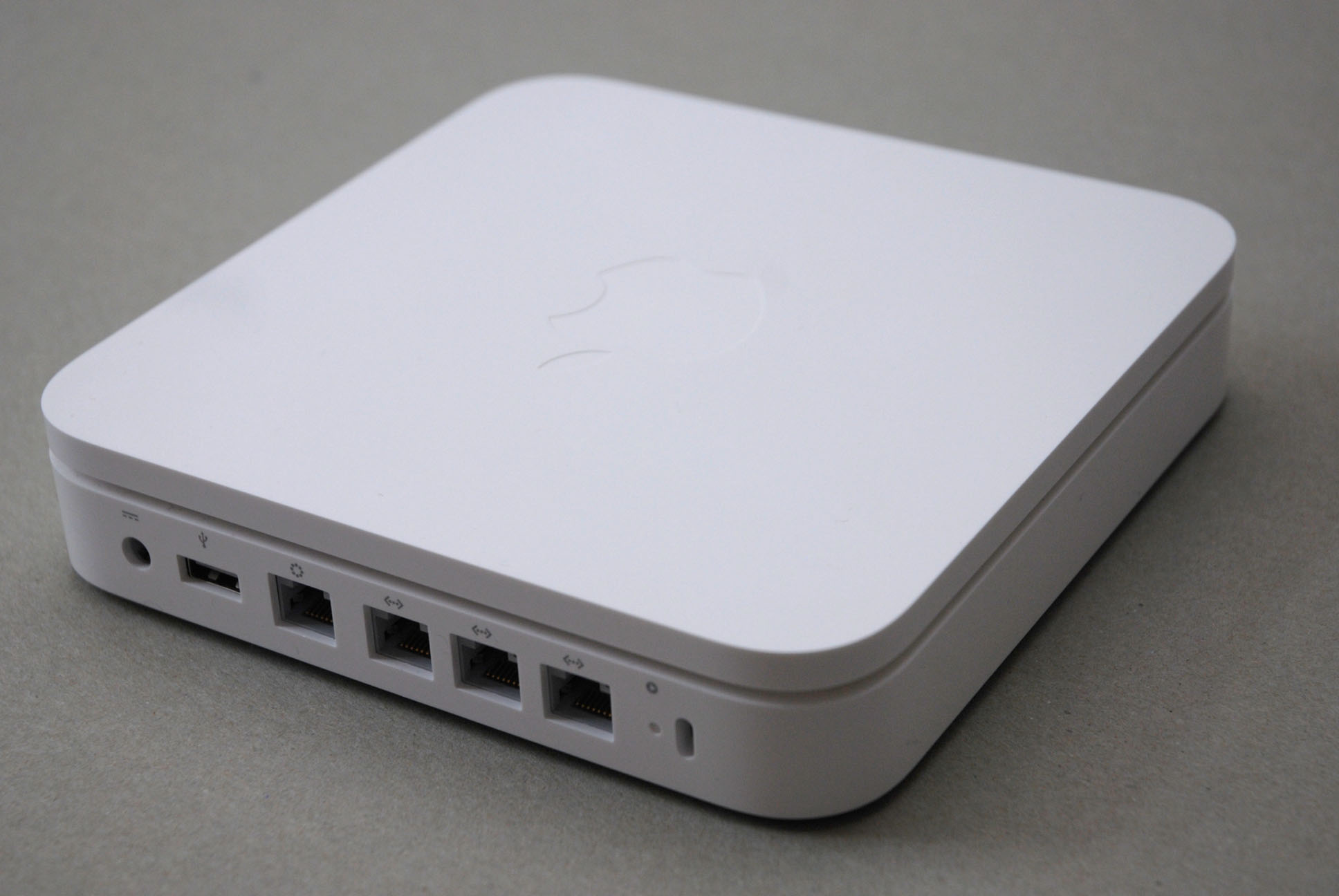
AirPort Extreme 802.11n

The AirPort Extreme was updated on January 9, 2007, to support the 802.11n protocol. This revision also adds two LAN ports for a total of three. It now more closely resembles the square-shaped 1st generation Apple TV and Mac Mini, and is about the same size as the mini.

The new AirPort Disk feature allows users to plug a USB hard drive into the AirPort Extreme for use as a network-attached storage (NAS) device for Mac OS X and Microsoft Windows clients. Users may also connect a USB hub and printer. The performance of USB hard drives attached to an AirPort Extreme is slower than if the drive were connected directly to a computer. This is due to the processor speed on the AirPort extreme. Depending on the setup and types of reads and writes, performance ranges from 0.5 to 17.5 MB/s for writing and 1.9 to 25.6 MB/s for reading. Performance for the same disk connected directly to a computer would be 6.6 to 31.6 MB/s for writing and 7.1 to 37.2 MB/s for reading.

The AirPort Extreme has no port for an external antenna.

On August 7, 2007, the AirPort Extreme began shipping with Gigabit Ethernet, matching most other Apple products.

On March 19, 2008, Apple released a firmware update for both models of the AirPort Extreme to allow AirPort Disks to be used in conjunction with Time Machine, similar to the functionality provided by Time Capsule. On March 3, 2009, Apple unveiled a new AirPort Extreme with simultaneous dual-band 802.11 Draft-N radios. This allows full 802.11 Draft-N 2x2 communication in both 802.11 Draft-N bands at the same time.

On October 20, 2009, Apple unveiled an updated AirPort Extreme base station with antenna improvements.

On June 21, 2011, Apple unveiled an updated AirPort Extreme base station, referred to as AirPort Extreme 802.11n (5th Generation).

=== AirPort Express ===
AirPort Express

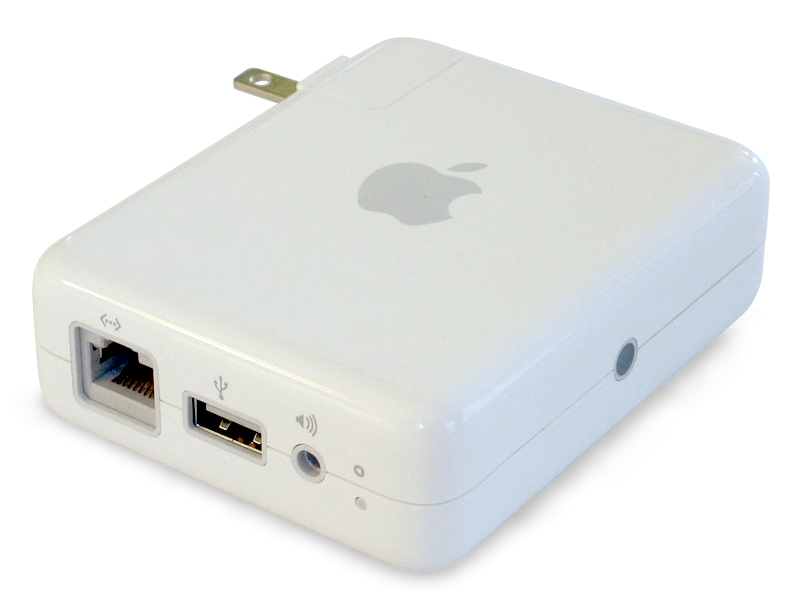
Original (2004)

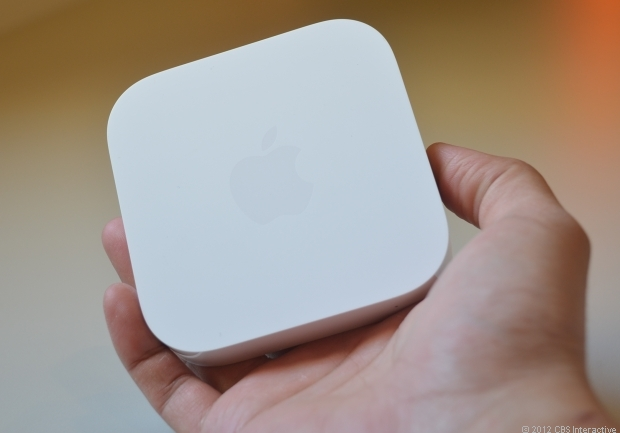
Revised (2012)

The AirPort Express is a simplified and compact AirPort Extreme base station. It allows up to 50 networked users, and includes a feature called AirTunes (predecessor to AirPlay). The original version (M9470LL/A, model A1084) was introduced by Apple on June 7, 2004, and includes an analog–optical audio mini-jack output, a USB port for remote printing or charging the iPod (iPod Shuffle only), and a single Ethernet port. The USB port cannot be used to connect a hard disk or other storage device.

The AirPort Express functions as a wireless access point when connected to an Ethernet network. It can be used as an Ethernet-to-wireless bridge under certain wireless configurations. It can be used to extend the range of a network, or as a printer and audio server.

In 2012, the AirPort Express took on a new shape, similar to that of the second and third generation Apple TV. The new product also features two 10/100 Mbit/s Ethernet LAN ports.

=== AirPort Time Capsule ===
Time Capsule

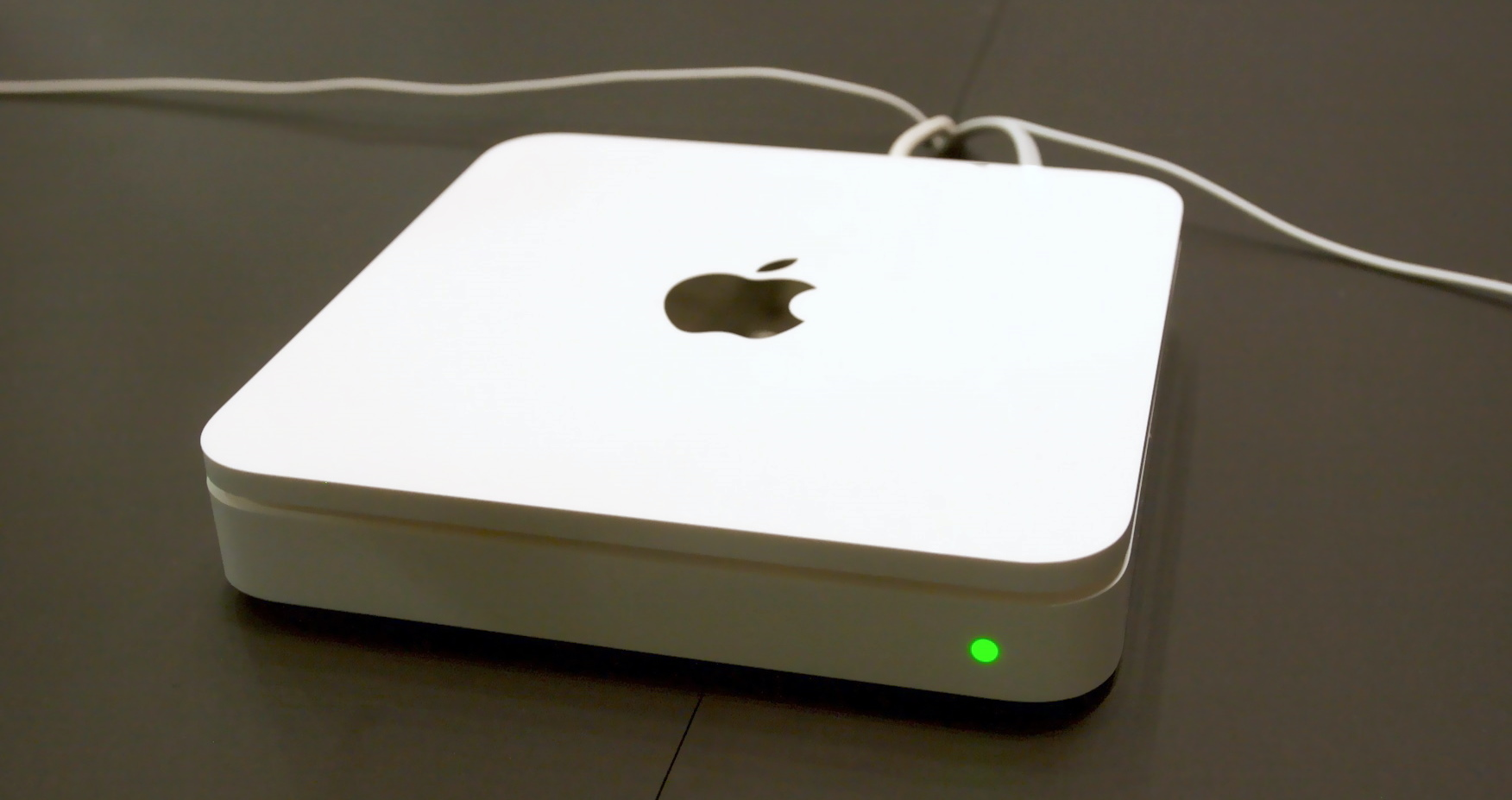
Original (2008)

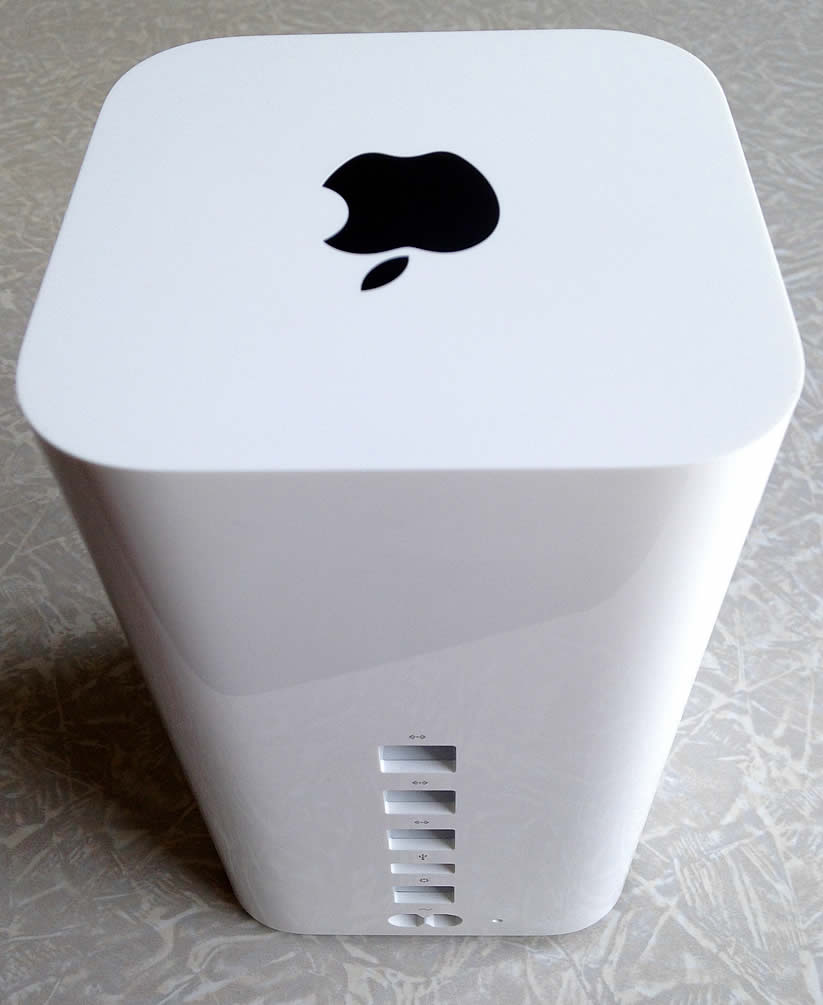
Tower (2013)

The AirPort Time Capsule is a version of AirPort Extreme with a built-in hard drive currently coming in either 2 TB or 3 TB sizes, with a previous version having 1 TB or 500 GB. It features a built-in design that, when used with Time Machine in Mac OS X Leopard, automatically makes incremental data backups. Acting as a wireless file server, AirPort Time Capsule can serve to back up multiple Macs. It also includes all AirPort Extreme (802.11 Draft-N) functionality.

On March 3, 2009, the Time Capsule was updated with simultaneous dual-band 802.11 Draft-N capability, remote AirPort Disk accessibility through Back to My Mac, and the ability to broadcast a guest network at the same time as an existing network.

On October 20, 2009, Apple unveiled the updated Time Capsule with antenna improvements resulting in wireless performance gains of both speed and range. Also stated is a resulting performance improvement/time reduction on Time Capsule backups of up to 60%.

In June 2011, Apple unveiled the updated Time Capsule with a higher capacity 2 TB and 3 TB. They also changed the wireless card from a Marvell chip to a Broadcom BCM4331 chip. When used in conjunction with the latest 2011 MacBooks, MacBook Pros, and MacBook Airs (which also use a Broadcom BCM4331 wireless chip), the wireless signal is improved thanks to Broadcom's Frame Bursting technology.

On June 10, 2013, Apple renamed the Time Capsule to the AirPort Time Capsule and added support for the 802.11ac standard.

AirPort Time Capsule backups will no longer be supported starting with macOS 27 in 2026.

== AirPort cards ==
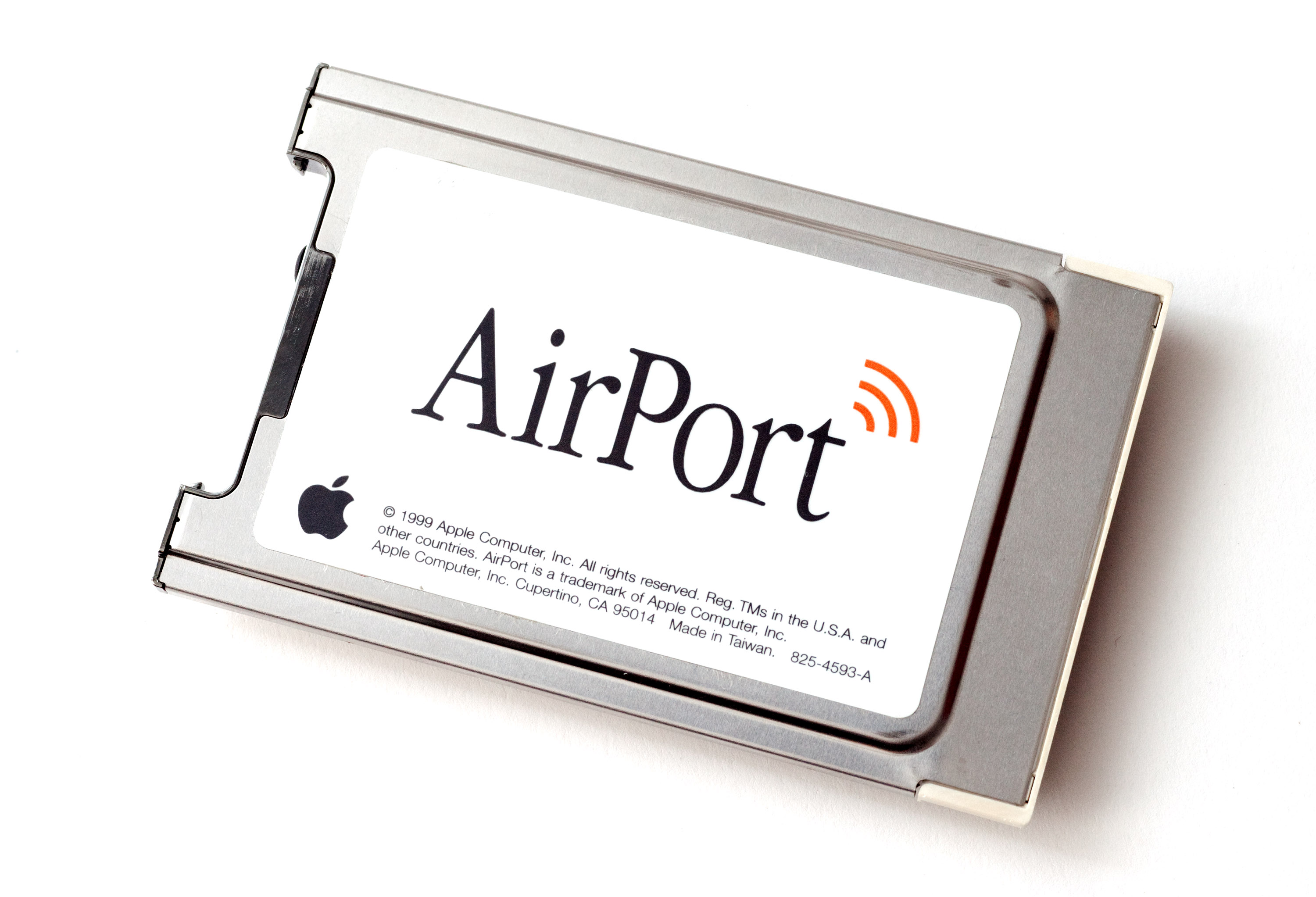
An original Apple AirPort 802.11b card

Apple produced numerous wireless card used to connect to wireless networks such as those provided by an AirPort Base Station.

=== AirPort 802.11b card ===
The original model, known as simply AirPort card, was a re-branded Lucent WaveLAN/Orinoco Gold PC card, in a modified housing that lacked the integrated antenna. It was designed to be capable of being user-installable. It was also modified in such a way that it could not be used in a regular PCMCIA slot (at the time it was significantly cheaper than the official WaveLAN/Orinoco Gold card).

An AirPort card adapter is required to use this card in the slot-loading iMacs.

=== AirPort Extreme 802.11g cards ===
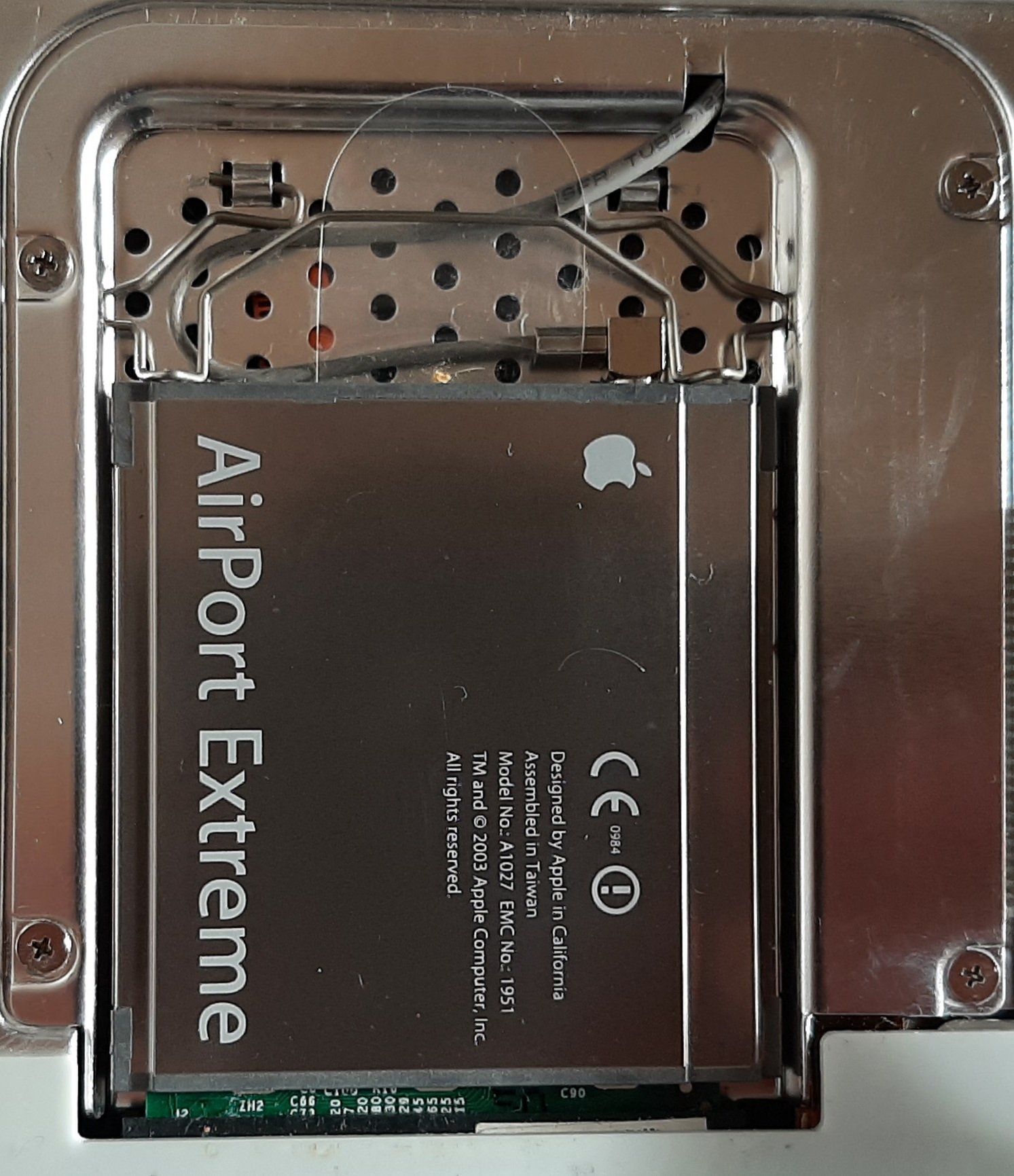
An Airport Extreme 802.11g card installed in an iBook G4

Corresponding with the release of the AirPort Extreme Base Station, the AirPort Extreme card became available as an option on the current models. It is based on a Broadcom 802.11g chipset and is housed in a custom form factor, but is electrically compatible with the Mini PCI standard. It was also capable of being user-installed.

Variants of the user-installable AirPort Extreme card are marked A-1010 (early North American spec), A-1026 (current North American spec), A-1027 (Europe/Asia spec (additional channels)) and A-1095 (unknown).

A different 802.11g card was included in the last iteration of the PowerPC-based PowerBooks and iBooks. A major distinction for this card was that it was the first "combo" card that included both 802.11g as well as Bluetooth. It was also the first card that was not user-installable. It was again a custom form factor, but was still electrically a Mini PCI interface for the Broadcom WLAN chip. A separate USB connection was used for the on-board Bluetooth chip.

The AirPort Extreme (802.11g) card was discontinued in January 2009.

=== Integrated AirPort Extreme 802.11a/b/g/n and /ac cards ===
As 802.11g began to come standard on all notebook models, Apple phased out the user-installable designs in their notebooks, iMacs and Mac Minis by mid-2005, moving to an integrated design. AirPort continued to be an option, either installed at purchase or later, on the Power Mac G5 and the Mac Pro.

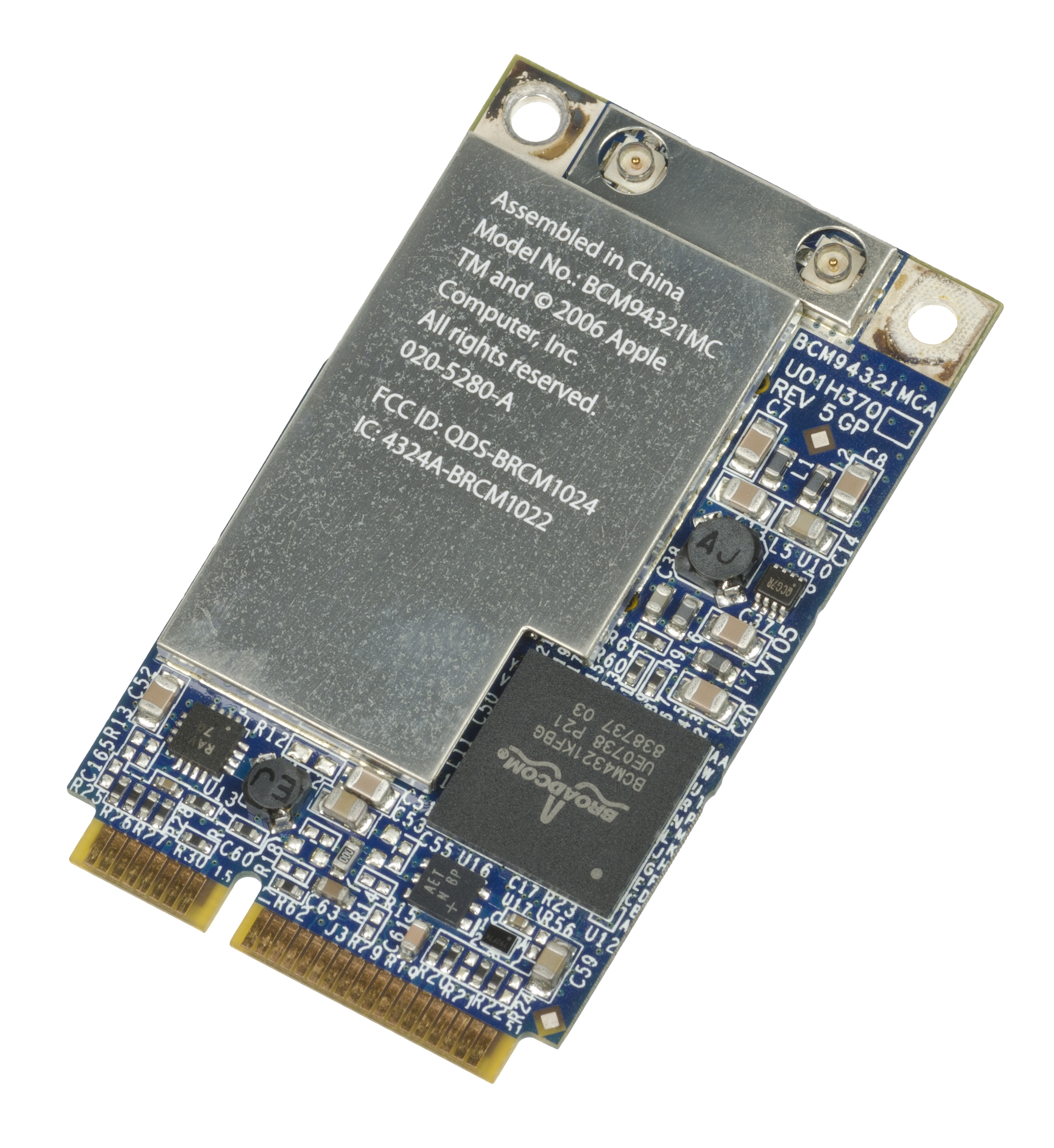
An Airport Extreme card pulled from a late 2007 MacBook

With the introduction of the Intel-based MacBook Pro in January 2006, Apple began to use a standard PCI Express mini card. The particular brand and model of card has changed over the years; in early models, it was Atheros brand, while since late 2008 they have been Broadcom cards. This distinction is mostly of concern to those who run other operating systems such as Linux on MacBooks, as different cards require different device drivers.

The MacBook Air Mid 2012 13", MacBook Air Mid 2011 13" and MacBook Air Late 2010 (11", A1370 and 13", Model A1369) each use a Broadcom BCM 943224 PCIEBT2 Wi-Fi card (main chip BCM43224: 2 × 2 2.4 GHz and 5 GHz).

The MacBook Pro Retina Mid 2012 uses Broadcom BCM94331CSAX (main chip BCM4331: 3 × 3 2.4 GHz and 5 GHz, up to 450 Mbit/s).

In early 2007, Apple announced that most Intel Core 2 Duo-based Macs, which had been shipping since November 2006, already included AirPort Extreme cards compatible with the draft-802.11 Draft-N specification. Apple also offered an application to enable 802.11 Draft-N functionality on these Macs for a fee of $1.99, or free with the purchase of an AirPort Extreme base station. Starting with Leopard, the Draft-N functionality was quietly enabled on all Macs that had Draft-N cards. This card was also a PCI Express mini design, but used three antenna connectors in the notebooks and iMacs, in order to use a 2 × 3 MIMO antenna configuration. The cards in the Mac Pro and Apple TV have two antenna connectors and support a 2 × 2 configuration. The Network Utility application located in Applications → Utilities can be used to identify the model and supported protocols of an installed AirPort card.

Starting with the 2013 MacBook Air, Macs began using the IEEE 802.11ac standard (main chip BCM4360: 2 × 2 : 2).

== Security ==
AirPort and AirPort Extreme support a variety of security technologies to prevent eavesdropping and unauthorized network access, including several forms of cryptography.

The original graphite AirPort base station used 40-bit Wired Equivalent Privacy (WEP). The second-generation model (known as Dual Ethernet or Snow) AirPort base station, like most other Wi-Fi products, used 40-bit or 128-bit Wired Equivalent Privacy (WEP). AirPort Extreme and Express base stations retain this option, but also allow and encourage the use of Wi-Fi Protected Access (WPA) and, as of July 14, 2005, WPA2.

AirPort Extreme cards, which use the Broadcom chipset, have the media access control layer in software. The driver is proprietary.

== AirPort Disk ==
The AirPort Disk feature shares a hard disk connected to an AirPort Extreme or Time Capsule (though not AirPort Express), as a small-scale NAS. AirPort Disk can be accessed from Windows and Linux as well as Mac OS X using the SMB/CIFS protocol for FAT volumes, and both SMB/CIFS and AFP for HFS+ partitions. NTFS- or exFAT-formatted volumes are not supported.

Although Windows does not natively support HFS+, an HFS+ volume on an AirPort Disk can be easily accessed from Windows. This is because the SMB/CIFS protocol used to access the disk, and hence access from Windows is filesystem-independent. Therefore, HFS+ is a viable option for Windows as well as OS X users, and more flexible than FAT32 as the latter has a 4 GiB file size limit.

Recent firmware versions cause the internal disk and any external USB drives to sleep after periods of time as short as 2 minutes.

A caveat of the use of AirPort Disk is that the AFP port 548 is reserved for the service, which then does not allow for simultaneous use of port forwarding to provide AFP services to external users. This is also true of a Time Capsule setup for use as a network-based Time Machine Backup location, its main purpose and default configuration. An AirPort administrator must choose between using AirPort Disk and providing remote access to AFP services.

The AirPort Extreme or Time Capsule will recognize multiple disks connected via a USB hub.

== See also ==
- AirDrop
- AirPrint
- iTunes
- Sleep Proxy Service
- Timeline of Apple products
- Wireless LAN
- IEEE 802.11
