= AEBS =

AEBS may refer to:

- Advanced Emergency Braking System, a safety feature on automobiles
- AirPort Extreme Base Station, an Apple Wi-Fi product
