= AirPort Time Capsule =

Wireless router by Apple

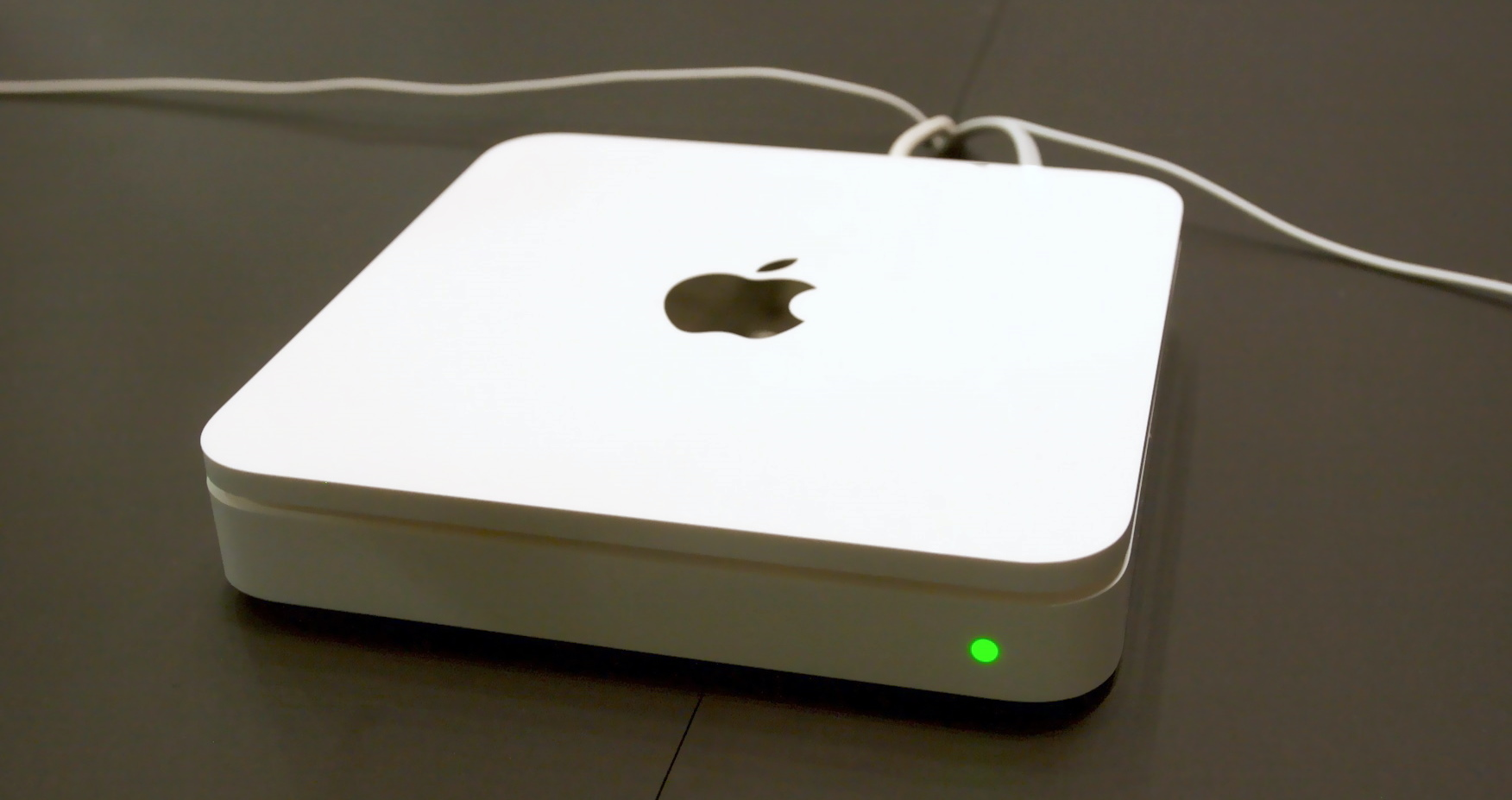
- Developer: Apple Inc.
- Type: Backup drive, AirPort Extreme base station
- Released: February 29, 2008
- Discontinued: April 26, 2018
- Storage: 500 GB to 3 TB Server-grade HDD

The AirPort Time Capsule (originally named Time Capsule) is a wireless router which was sold by Apple Inc., featuring network-attached storage (NAS) and a residential gateway router, and is one of Apple's AirPort products. It is essentially a version of the AirPort Extreme with an internal hard drive. Apple describes it as a "Backup Appliance", designed to work in tandem with the Time Machine backup software utility introduced in Mac OS X Leopard 10.5.

Introduced on January 15, 2008 and released on February 29, 2008, the device has been upgraded several times, matching upgrades in the Extreme series routers. The earliest versions supported 802.11n wireless and came with a 500 GB hard drive in the base model, while the latest model, introduced in 2013, features 802.11ac and a 3 TB hard drive. All models include four Gigabit Ethernet ports (3 LAN ports, 1 WAN port) and a single USB port. The USB port can be used for external peripheral devices to be shared over the network, such as external hard drives or printers. The NAS functionality utilizes a built-in "server grade" hard drive.

In 2016, Apple disbanded its wireless router development team, and in 2018 the entire AirPort line of products was discontinued without replacement.

AirPort Time Capsule backups only function with Macs running Mac OS X Leopard 10.5 through macOS Tahoe 26, and compatibility with Time Capsule backups was removed with macOS Golden Gate 27 in 2026.

The third-party open-source project TimeCapsuleSMB provides modern SMB support for Apple Time Capsules and enables their continued use as network shares and Time Machine backup targets on newer versions of macOS.

== History ==
In early 2009, Apple released the second-generation Time Capsule. It offered simultaneous 802.11n dual-band operation, which allows older devices to use slower wireless speeds, without affecting the overall performance of devices that can use higher 802.11n speeds. The second-generation model also included the addition of Guest Networking, a feature which allows creation of a separate wireless network for guests. The guest network uses different authentication credentials, ensuring the security of the primary network. The hard disk storage space of each model was doubled: capacities were 1 TB and 2 TB, while the prices remained unchanged.

In October 2009, several news sites reported that many first-generation Time Capsules were failing after 18 months, with some users alleging that this was due to a design failure in the power supplies. Apple confirmed that certain Time Capsules sold between February 2008 and June 2008 do not power on, or may unexpectedly turn off. Apple offered free repair or replacement to affected units.

The third-generation Time Capsule was released in October 2009. The only change was a reconfiguration of the internal wireless antenna, resulting in an Apple-reported 50% increase in wireless performance and 25% increase in wireless range when compared to previous models.

The fourth-generation Time Capsule, released in June 2011, increased the range of Wi-Fi signals. The internal Wi-Fi card was changed from a Marvell Wi-Fi chip to a better-performing Broadcom BCM4331 chip.

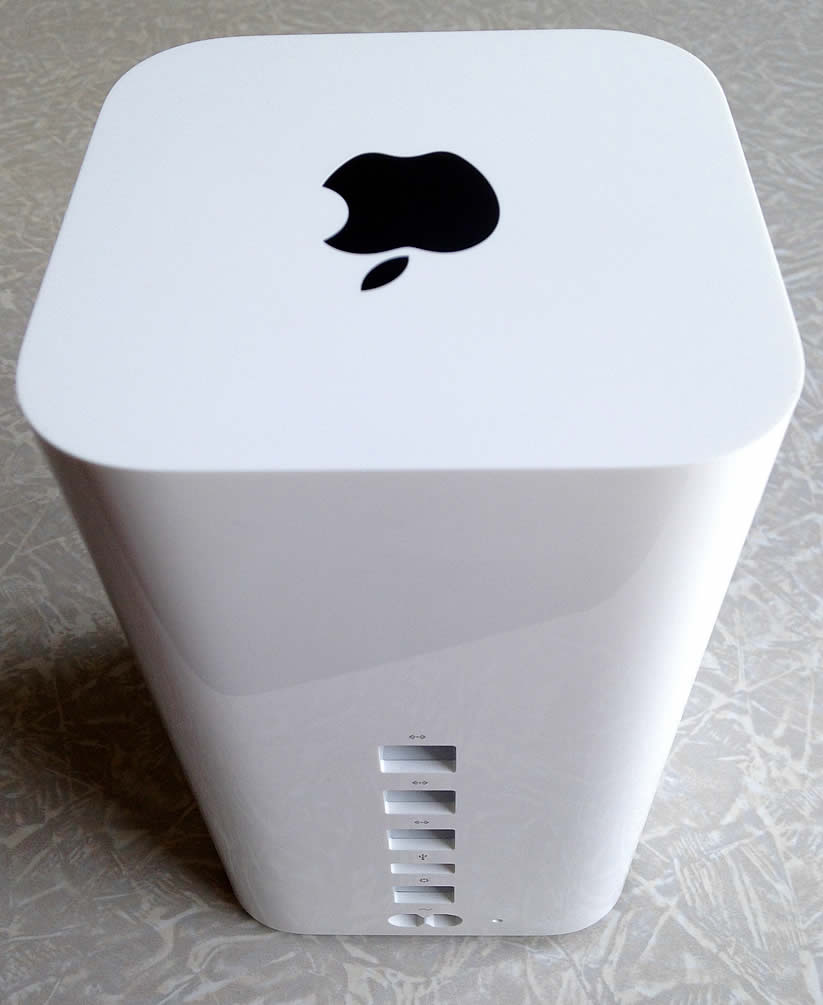
Rear ports on fifth-generation AirPort Time Capsule

=== Discontinuation ===
Around 2016, Apple disbanded the wireless router team that developed the AirPort Time Capsule and AirPort Extreme routers. In 2018, Apple formally discontinued both products, exiting the router market. Bloomberg noted that "Apple rarely discontinues product categories" and that its decision to leave the business was "a boon for other wireless router makers."

AirPort Time Capsule backups no longer function as of macOS Golden Gate 27, because Apple removed support for Apple Filing Protocol (AFP).

== Features ==
The fifth-generation Time Capsule includes a fully featured, 802.11ac, Wi-Fi access point including simultaneous dual-band operation. The Time Capsule supports the Sleep Proxy Service.

The software is specially built by Apple and is not user modifiable. While the firmware has been decrypted, a suitable privilege escalation exploit to run custom firmware is not developed for the latest firmware. However, the device runs a POSIX standard platform. The Time Capsule up to the fourth-generation runs on the ARM port of operating system NetBSD 4.0, while the fifth-generation model runs NetBSD 6.

One of the key features of Time Capsule is the ability to back up a system and files wirelessly and automatically, eliminating the need to attach an external backup drive. This feature requires OS X 10.5.2 Leopard or greater on the client computers. The backup software is Apple's Time Machine, which, by default, makes hourly images of the files that are being changed, and condenses backup images as they become older, to save space. Even when using an 802.11n wireless or Gigabit Ethernet connection, the initial backup of any Mac to the drive requires significant time; Apple suggests that the initial backup will require "several hours or overnight to complete".

The hard drive typically found in a Time Capsule is the Hitachi Deskstar, which is sold by Hitachi as a consumer-grade product—the Hitachi Ultrastar is the enterprise version. Apple labeled the drive as a server-grade drive in promotional material for Time Capsule, and also used this type of drive in its discontinued Xserve servers. Apple states that the Hitachi Deskstar meets or exceeds the 1 million hours mean time between failures (MTBF) recommendation for server-grade hard drives.

The 500 GB, first-generation Time Capsule shipped with a Seagate Barracuda ES-series drive; or subsequently, other hard drives such as the Western Digital Caviar Green series.

The Time Capsules up to the fourth-generation measure 7.7 inches (200 mm) square, and 1.4 inches (36 mm) high.

The June 2013 release of the fifth-generation models features a name change to AirPort Time Capsule, and a redesign with measurements 3.85 inches (9.8 cm) square, and 6.6 inches (17 cm) high. The square dimensions echo the size of both the latest AirPort Express and Apple TVs (second generation onwards), just with the height being significantly higher. The 2013 models feature the same I/O ports on the back as previous generations, and come in the same capacities as the fourth-generation of 2 TB & 3 TB, but have introduced the newest Wi-Fi standard 802.11ac. The AirPort Extreme released at the same time is exactly the same in dimensions and I/O ports, just without the internal harddrive of the AirPort Time Capsule. 2013 models feature faster download speed, beamforming improvements and wireless or desktop network control with iCloud integration. AirPort is compatible with devices using the 802.11a, 802.11b, 802.11g, 802.11n and 802.11ac specifications. Also improved, AirPort Utility has added one click Time Capsule format from the utility's AirPort Time Capsule, Edit, Disks menu, allowing easy and rapid Erase Disk and Archive Disk to start over or configure Network. Disk Erase includes up to 35 passes and device includes encrypted storage plus optional WAN sharing, making AirPort extremely secure and flexible for home, class and office environments. AirPort Utility is a free download.

Fifth-generation models are known to use Seagate Barracuda ST2000DM001 2 TB and ST3000DM001 3 TB drives, which have observed abnormally high failure rates.

== Comparison chart ==
Model	1st generation (early 2008)		2nd generation (early & mid 2009)			3rd generation (late 2009)		4th generation (mid 2011)		5th generation (mid 2013)	
Marketing name	Time Capsule									AirPort Time Capsule	
Release date	February 29, 2008		March 3, 2009		July 30, 2009	October 20, 2009		June 21, 2011		June 10, 2013	
Marketing model number	MB276LL/A	MB277LL/A	MB764LL/A	MB765LL/A	MB996LL/A	MC343LL/A	MC344LL/A	MD032LL/A	MD033LL/A	ME177LL/A	ME182LL/A
Model number	A1254		A1302			A1355		A1409		A1470	
Hard drive	500 GB	1 TB	500 GB	1 TB	2 TB	1 TB	2 TB		3 TB	2 TB	3 TB
Original price	US$299	US$499	US$299	US$499	US$499	US$299	US$499	US$299	US$499	US$299	US$399
Original price	US$299	US$499	US$299	US$299 (Note: Price cut in July 2009 with introduction of 2 TB model, as the 1 TB model became the lower-capacity Time Capsule.)	US$499	US$299	US$499	US$299	US$499	US$299	US$399
Guest networking	No		Yes								
802.11a/b/g/n 2.4 GHz / 5 GHz bands	Single-band operation		Dual-band operation								
Internal Wi-Fi	Marvell		Atheros AR9220/AR9223			Marvell		Broadcom BCM4331		Broadcom BCM4360	
Standards	802.11 DSSS 1 & 2 Mbit/s standard, 802.11a/b/g/n (draft)					802.11 DSSS 1 & 2 Mbit/s standard, 802.11a/b/g/n				802.11 DSSS 1 & 2 Mbit/s standard, 802.11ac (draft)/a/b/g/n	
Data link protocol	Gigabit Ethernet, IEEE 802.11a/b/g/n (draft)					Gigabit Ethernet, IEEE 802.11a/b/g/n				Gigabit Ethernet, IEEE 802.11ac (draft)/a/b/g/n	
Network / transport protocol	Bonjour, IPsec, L2TP, PPTP		Bonjour, DHCP, DNS, IPsec, L2TP, PPPoE, PPTP								
CPU	Marvell 1850 step A0 (Feroceon core) [88F5281 Rev 4]		?								
RAM	128 MB		?								
FLASH	16 MB		?								

== See also ==
- AirPlay
