= AirPort Express =

Wi-Fi base station by Apple

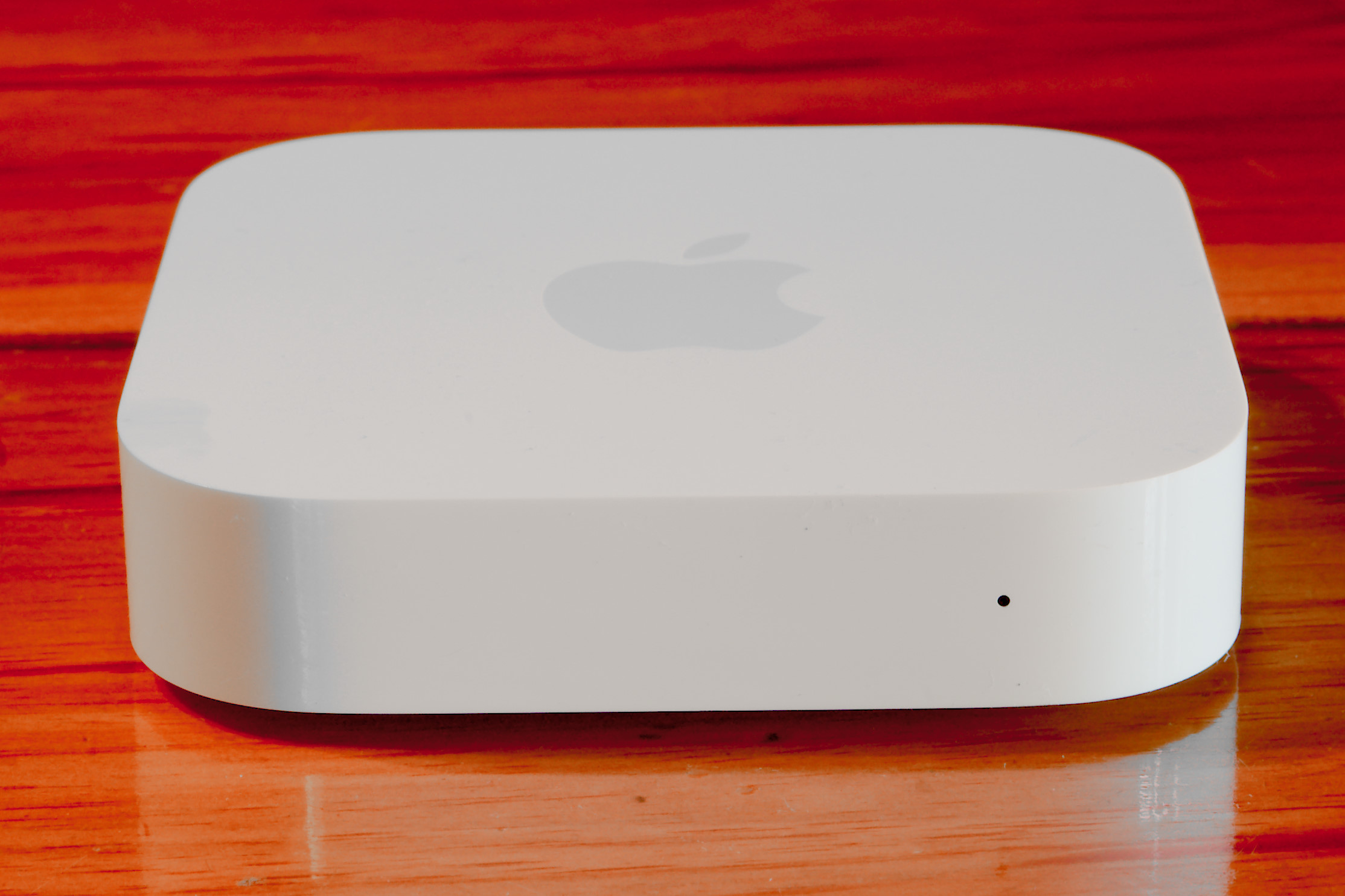
The redesigned AirPort Express released in 2012

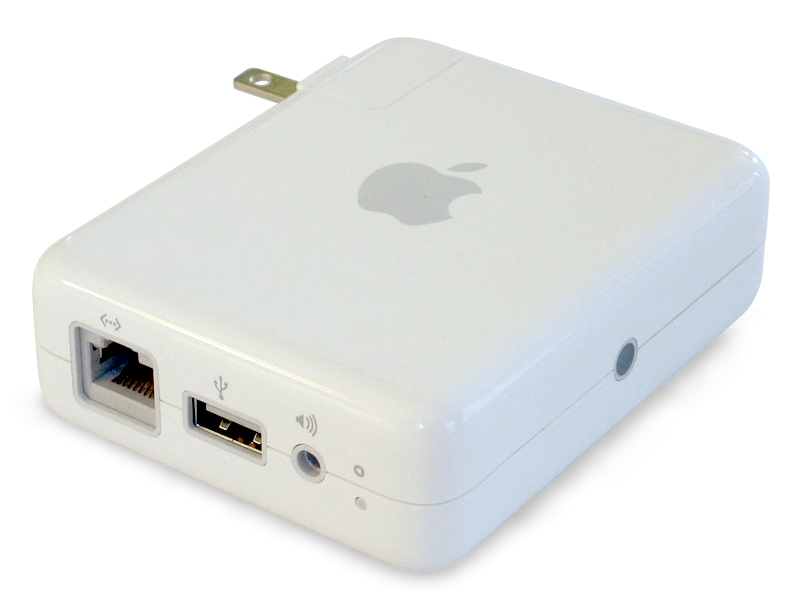
First-generation AirPort Express

Historical development of some wireless router chipset variants

AirPort Express is a discontinued line of Wi-Fi base stations made by Apple Inc. from 2004 to 2018. It was positioned as the entry-level router in the AirPort product line, below the AirPort Extreme and AirPort Time Capsule. While more compact and in some ways simpler than the AirPort Extreme, the Express offered audio output capability the Extreme lacked. The AirPort Express was the first AirPlay device that could receive audio streamed from a computer running iTunes on the local network. In Japan, the AirPort Express was sold as the AirMac Express.

== Description ==
When connected to an Ethernet network, the Express can function as a wireless access point. The latest model allows up to 50 networked users. It can be used as an Ethernet-to-wireless bridge under certain wireless configurations. It can be used to extend the range of a network, including functioning as a printer and audio server. The model introduced in June 2012 includes two Ethernet ports: one WAN and one LAN.

The AirPort Express uses an audio connector that combines a 3.5 mm minijack socket and a mini-TOSLINK optical digital transmitter, allowing connection to an external digital-to-analog converter (DAC) or amplifier with internal DAC. Standard audio CDs ripped in iTunes into Apple Lossless format streamed to the AirPort Express will output a bit-for-bit identical bitstream when compared to the original CD (provided any sound enhancement settings in iTunes are disabled). DTS-encoded CDs ripped to Apple Lossless audio files - which decode as digital white noise in iTunes - will play back correctly when the AirPort Express is connected via TOSLINK to a DTS-compatible amplifier–decoder. This is limited to 16-bit and 44.1 kHz when streaming from iTunes; any higher quality content, such as high fidelity audio that uses up to 24-bit and/or 192 kHz will be truncated down to 16-bit and 44.1 kHz.

The audio output feature of the AirPort Express on a system running OS X Lion or earlier can only be used to wirelessly stream audio files from within iTunes to an attached stereo system. It cannot be used to output the soundtrack of iTunes video content to an attached stereo. OS X Mountain Lion introduced AirPlay support, a feature to output Mac system-wide audio directly to AirPort Express. This allows output of the audio of protected video content within iTunes, and also correctly maintains the audio sync with the image displayed on-screen. Video is synced with output audio when playing the video through an AirPort Express if the video is in a format supported by QuickTime Player (such as HTML 5 video in Safari etc.).

For Windows and Mac operating systems (before OS X Mountain Lion) there are a few software options available for streaming system-wide audio to the AirPort Express, such as Airfoil and TuneBlade. For the Logitech Media Server (Squeezeserver), the AirPlay bridge plugin allows it to behave as a seamless SqueezePlayer client.

== History ==
=== 2004 model ===
The first version (M9470LL/A, model A1084) was introduced by Apple on July 7, 2004; it included an analog–optical audio mini-jack output, a USB port for remote printing, and one Ethernet port. The USB port could also be used to charge the first generation iPod Shuffle, although this was not supported by Apple. The main processor of the 802.11g AirPort Express was a Broadcom BCM4712KFB wireless networking chipset, which incorporated a 200 MHz MIPS processor. The audio was handled by a Texas Instruments Burr-Brown PCM2705 16-bit digital-to-analog converter.

=== 2008 model ===
An updated version (MB321LL/A, model A1264) supporting the faster 802.11 Draft-N draft specification and operation in either of the 2.4 GHz and 5 GHz bands, with almost all other features identical, was introduced by Apple in March 2008. The revised unit includes an 802.11a/n (5 GHz) mode, which allows adding Draft-N to an existing 802.11b/g network without disrupting existing connections, while preserving the increased throughput that Draft-N can provide. Up to 10 wireless units can connect to this AirPort Express.

=== 2012 model ===
In 2012 Apple introduced a completely redesigned model with a new square form factor and two ethernet ports.

On August 28, 2018 Apple added AirPlay 2 support to the 2012 AirPort Express, providing the ability to be added to the Apple Home app as an audio destination.

=== Discontinuation and support ===
On November 21, 2016, Bloomberg reported that Apple had disbanded its wireless router division. In an April 2018 statement to 9to5Mac, Apple announced the discontinuation of the AirPort line and exit from the consumer router market. Apple continued supporting the AirPort Express, although an older version of its "AirPort Utility" is required to support the earliest version of the device.

== Models ==
AirPort Express Base Station models
U.S. model number	Product family number	Date	Wi-Fi standard	Features	Consumer Nickname	AirPort Utility Versions
M9470LL/A	A1084 / A1088	July 2004 - March 2008	802.11b/g	10/100 Ethernet WAN or LAN port; Analog/digital audio output jack; USB Printer Port	AirPort Express 802.11g (1st Generation)	Mac: 5.x iOS: none Windows 5.5.3, 5.6.1
MB321LL/A	A1264	March 2008 – June 2012	802.11a/b/g/Draft N	Wireless-to-Ethernet bridge; 10/100 Base-T Ethernet WAN or LAN port; Analog/digital audio output jack (AirTunes, AirPlay v1); USB Printer Port	AirPort Express 802.11n (1st Generation)	Mac: 5.x (OS X 10.5.9+) - 6.x iOS: 1.0 - 1.3; Windows 5.6.1
MC414LL/A	A1392	June 2012 – April 2018	802.11a/b/g/n simultaneous dual-band	Wireless-to-Ethernet bridge; 2 10/100 Ethernet ports: WAN or LAN, LAN only; Analog/digital audio output jack; USB Printer Port; AirPlay 2	AirPort Express 802.11n (2nd Generation)	Mac: 5.6 - 6.x iOS: 1.0 - 1.3; Windows 5.6.1

== See also ==
- AirPort Time Capsule
