= Burr-Brown Corporation =

Semiconductor company

- Type: Public
- Industry: Semiconductor
- Defunct: 2000; 26 years ago
- Fate: Acquired by Texas Instruments
- Headquarters: 6730 South Tucson Boulevard, #BC-7; Tucson, Arizona 85706; U.S.

The Burr-Brown Corporation was an American technology company in Tucson, Arizona, which designed, manufactured, and marketed a broad line of proprietary, standard, high-performance, analog and mixed-signal integrated circuits (ICs) used in electronic signal processing. The company's products were used in a wide range of applications: industrial process and control, including nuclear power generation, telecommunications, test and measurement, medical and scientific instrumentation, medical imaging, digital audio and video, personal computing and multimedia.

In September 2000, Texas Instruments acquired the company for US$7.6 billion.

== History ==
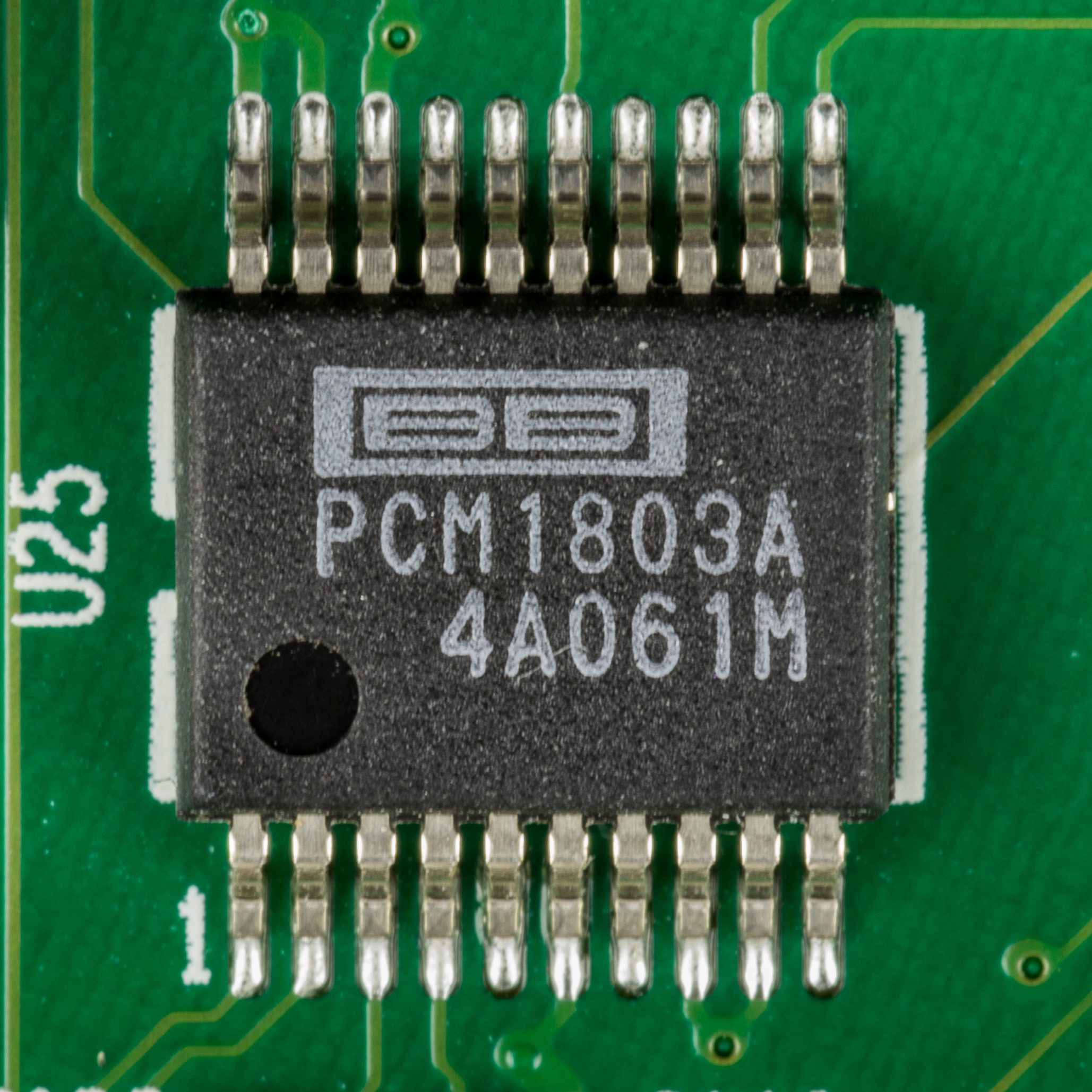
Burr-Brown PCM1803A, a 24-bit, 96-kHz stereo A/D converter

In 1983, the company reincorporated in Delaware and went public with its shares listed on the regulated market on NASDAQ under the symbol BBRC.

The company was incorporated in Tucson, Arizona in 1956 by founders Page Burr (Princeton 1944) and Thomas R. Brown Jr. (BS MIT 1949, MBA Harvard 1952) to commercialize semiconductor transistors; in 1959, the company posted its first profit. Brown eventually bought out Burr's share of the company.

The company employed over 1,300 people worldwide with manufacturing and technical facilities located in Tucson, Arizona; Atsugi, Japan; and Livingston, Scotland. Company headquarters was located in Tucson.

Burr-Brown was one of the principal suppliers of precision analog and data acquisition products to the electronic industry. The company pioneered many analog semiconductor products and techniques, such as active laser-trimming.

Texas Instruments Inc. completed its $6.1 billion acquisition of electronic-components maker Burr-Brown Corp on June 21, 2000.
