= AirPort Extreme =

Residential gateway

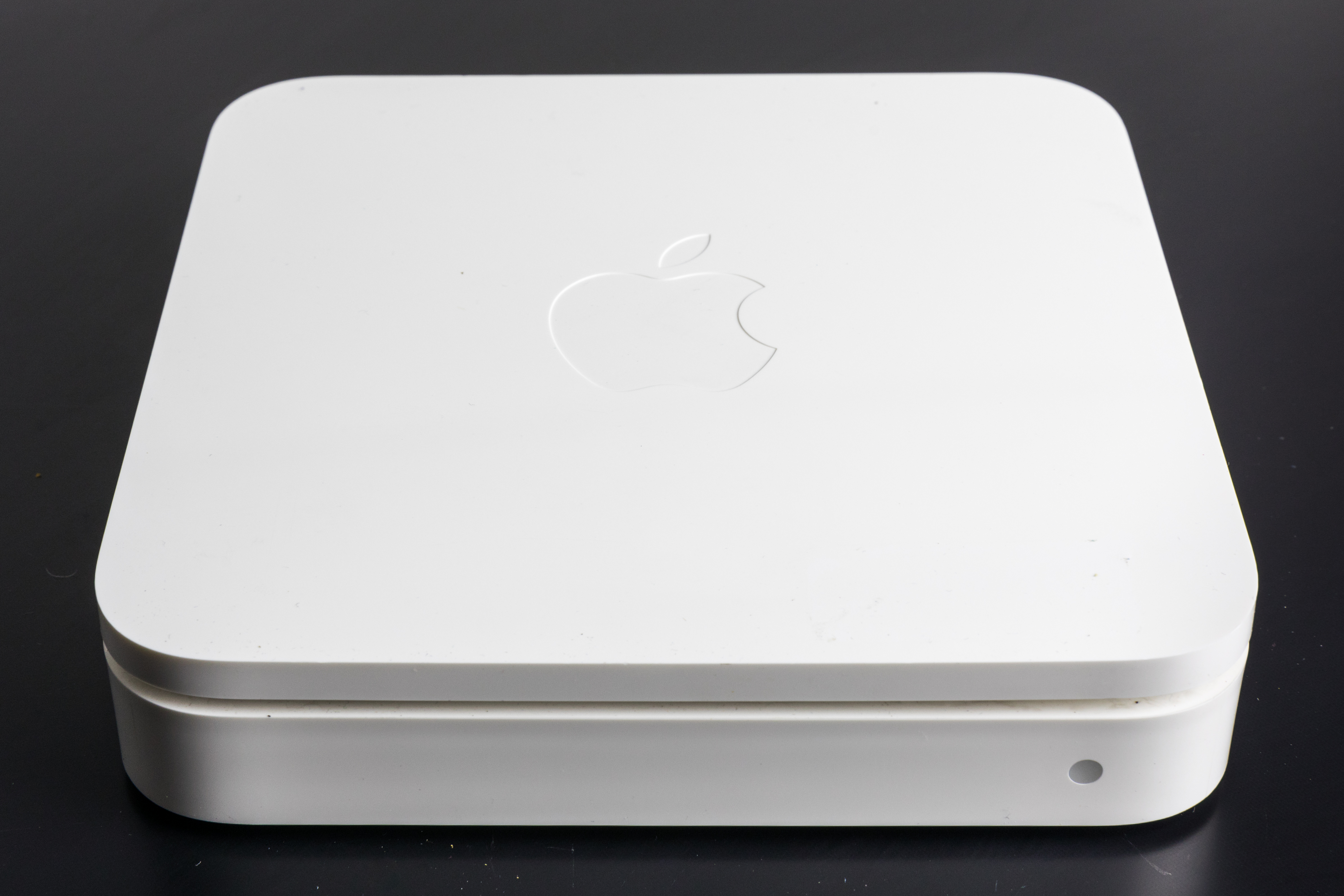
An AirPort Extreme 5th generation

Historical development of some wireless router chipset variants

AirPort Extreme is a discontinued line of residential gateways made by Apple Inc. that combine the functions of a router, network switch, wireless access point and NAS as well as varied other functions. The latest model, the 6th generation, supports 802.11ac networking in addition to older standards. Versions of the same system with a built-in network-accessible hard drive are known as the AirPort Time Capsule.

Apple discontinued its wireless routers in 2018, but as of 2026 continues limited hardware and software support.

== History ==
The first AirPort Extreme was announced at the MacWorld expo in San Francisco on January 7, 2003. It featured 802.11g wireless technology for the first time in an AirPort base station.

The name "AirPort Extreme" originally referred to any one of Apple's AirPort products that implemented the (then) newly introduced 802.11g Wi-Fi standard, differentiating it from earlier devices that ran the slower 802.11a and b standards. At that time (circa 2003) the gateway part of this lineup was known as the AirPort Extreme Base Station. With the addition of the even faster Draft-N standards in early 2009 the naming of "Base Station" was dropped, and was renamed to AirPort Extreme. Several minor upgrades followed with the wireless-N models, mostly to change antenna and wireless output power. In 2013, a major upgrade changed the physical structure of the device, added 802.11ac support, and added more antennas.

The AirPort Extreme has gone through three distinct physical forms. The earliest models had a similar plastic housing to the original AirPort Base Station, in a round "flying saucer" shape. From 2007 to 2013, the devices took on a flat rounded rectangle shape, similar in layout and size to the Mac mini or early models of the Apple TV. The 2013 model had a more vertical form, taller than it was wide.

=== Discontinuation ===
In 2016, Apple disbanded the wireless router team that developed the AirPort Time Capsule and AirPort Extreme router. In 2018, Apple formally discontinued both products, exiting the router market. Bloomberg noted that "Apple rarely discontinues product categories" and that its decision to leave the business was "a boon for other wireless router makers."

== Features ==
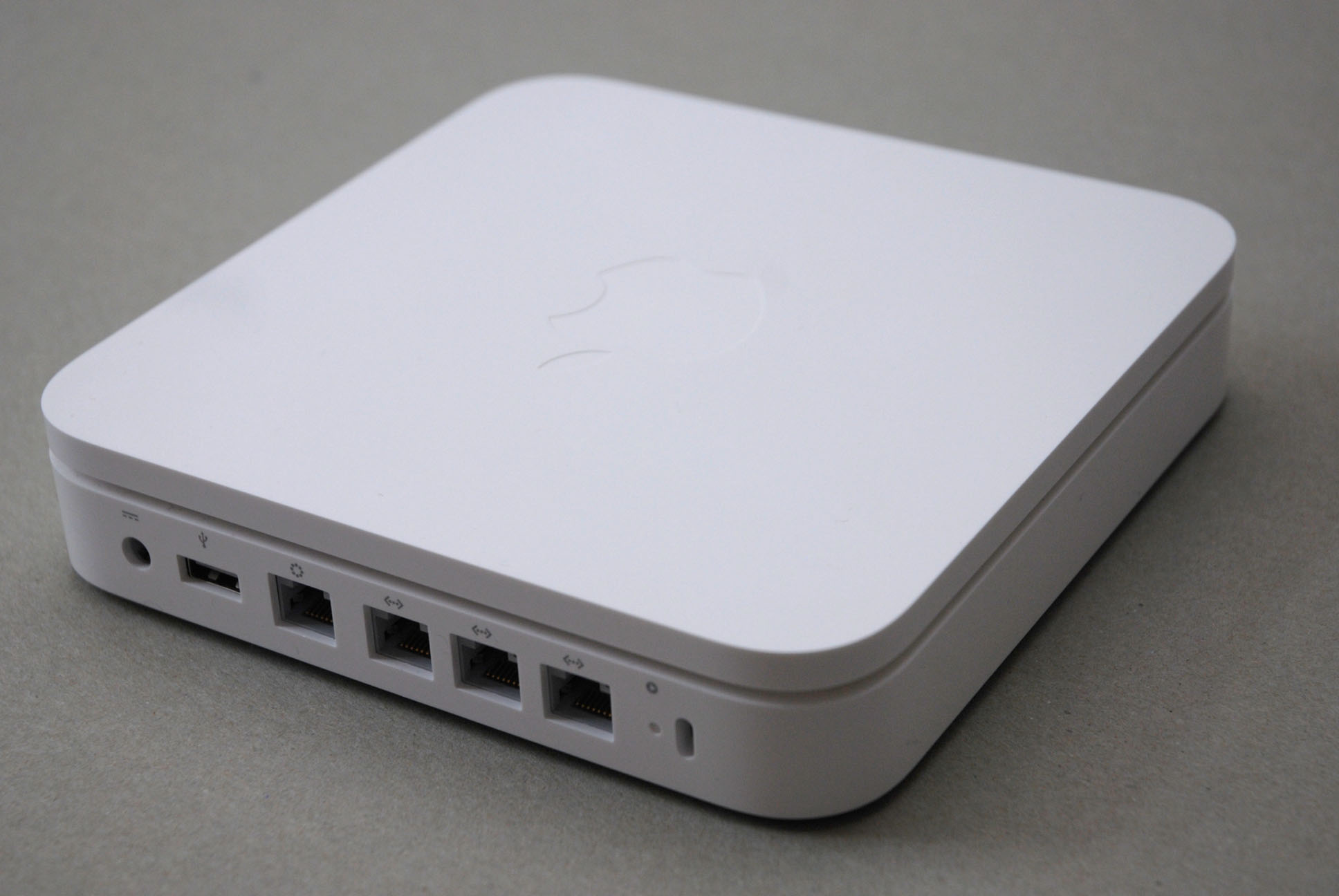
The back of a 2007 AirPort Extreme, showing the ports

=== Overview ===
- Fully featured 802.11ac Wi-Fi base station
- Sleep Proxy Service
- 4 Ethernet ports (3 LAN ports, 1 WAN port) — all ports are gigabit Ethernet on newer versions
- USB 2.0 interface for disk and printer sharing
- Built-in file server (AFP and SMB)
- Runs VxWorks Operating System by WindRiver or a customized version of NetBSD.

=== AirPort Disk ===
The AirPort Disk feature allows users to plug a USB hard drive into the AirPort Extreme for use as a network-attached storage (NAS) device for Mac OS X and Microsoft Windows clients. Users may also connect a USB hub and printer. The performance of USB hard drives attached to an AirPort Extreme is slower than if the drive were connected directly to a computer. This is due to the processor speed on the AirPort Extreme. Depending on the setup and types of reads and writes, performance ranges from 0.5 to 17.5 MB/s for writing and 1.9 to 25.6 MB/s for reading. Performance for the same disk connected directly to a computer would be 6.6 to 31.6 MB/s for writing and 7.1 to 37.2 MB/s for reading. NTFS-formatted drives are not supported.

== Models by generation ==
=== Original generation (2003) ===
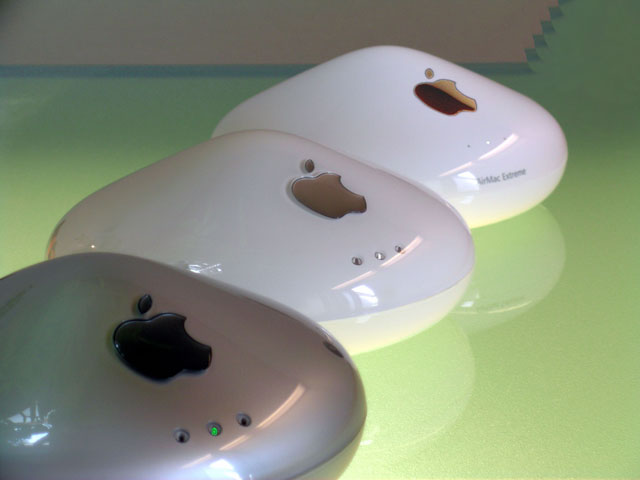
First three AirPort Base Station models, including the AirPort Extreme to the right (called AirMac Extreme in Japan)

The original AirPort Extreme Base Station in 2003 was so named because of its support for the 802.11g standard of the day, as well as for its ability to serve up to 50 Macs or PCs simultaneously. One feature found in most models of this generation was an internal 56K dial-up modem, allowing homes that lacked a broadband connection to enjoy wireless connectivity, albeit at dial-up speeds. It was the only generation to use the "flying saucer" form factor. Later generations would adopt the short, rounded-square form factor that would be seen until 2013.

=== 1st generation ===
On January 9, 2007 the AirPort Extreme began shipping, with support for 802.11n draft specification, and built-in wireless print and storage server.

=== 2nd generation ===
On March 19, 2008, Apple released a firmware update for both models of the AirPort Extreme that, according to third-party reports, allowed AirPort Disks to be used in conjunction with Time Machine, similar to the functionality provided by AirPort Time Capsule.

=== 3rd generation ===
On March 3, 2009, Apple unveiled a new AirPort Extreme with simultaneous dual-band 802.11 Draft-N radios. This allowed full 802.11 Draft-N 2x2 communication in both 802.11 Draft-N bands at the same time.

=== 4th generation ===
On October 20, 2009, Apple unveiled an updated AirPort Extreme with antenna improvements.

=== 5th generation ===
On June 21, 2011, Apple unveiled an updated AirPort Extreme, referred to as AirPort Extreme 802.11n (5th Generation).

The detailed table of output power comparison between the 4th generation model MC340LL/A and the 5th generation model MD031LL/A can be seen below:

Frequency range (MHz)	Mode	AirPort Extreme model	Output power (dBm)	Output power (mW)	Comparison (percent)	Difference (percent)
2412–2462	802.11b	4th generation	24.57	286.42	100	-10.3
2412–2462	802.11b	5th generation	24.10	257.04	89.7	-10.3
2412–2462	802.11g	4th generation	21.56	143.22	100	+114.8
2412–2462	802.11g	5th generation	24.88	307.61	214.8	+114.8
2412–2462	802.11n HT20	4th generation	21.17	130.92	100	+96.8
2412–2462	802.11n HT20	5th generation	24.11	257.63	196.8	+96.8
5745–5825	802.11a	4th generation	23.07	202.77	100	+61.1
5745–5825	802.11a	5th generation	25.14	326.59	161.1	+61.1
5745–5805	802.11n HT20	4th generation	22.17	164.82	100	+104.6
5745–5805	802.11n HT20	5th generation	25.28	337.29	204.6	+104.6
5755–5795	802.11n HT40	4th generation	21.44	139.32	100	+181.8
5755–5795	802.11n HT40	5th generation	25.94	392.64	281.8	+181.8

Note: A 3 dB increase is equivalent to a doubling of power output.

=== 6th generation ===
On June 10, 2013, Apple unveiled an updated AirPort Extreme, referred to as AirPort Extreme 802.11ac (6th Generation). The 6th generation AirPort Extreme (and 5th generation AirPort Time Capsule) featured three-stream 802.11ac Wi-Fi technology with a maximum data rate of 1.3 Gbit/s, which is nearly three times faster than 802.11n. Time Machine was now supported using an external USB hard drive connected to AirPort Extreme (802.11ac model only).

== Comparison chart ==
Approx. release date	Consumer nickname	AirPort Extreme	Model	Wireless standard	Gigabit Ethernet	Guest network	Radio type	MIMO	IPv6 router mode***	Time-Machine Backup****	CPU	RAM	FLASH
January 7, 2003	Original/round	M8799LL/A	A1034	802.11b/g	No	No	Single band 2.4 GHz	No	No	No	AMD Alchemy Au1500 (333 MHz) MIPS	32 MB	
January 9, 2007	1st generation	MA073LL/A	A1143	802.11a/b/g/n^{*}	No	No	Dual band 2.4 GHz or 5 GHz	3×3:2	No	No	Marvell 1850 step A0 (Feroceon core) [88F5281 Rev 4]	64 MB	16 MB
August 7, 2007	2nd generation	MB053LL/A	A1143	802.11a/b/g/n^{*}	Yes	No	Dual band 2.4 GHz or 5 GHz	3×3:2	No	No			
March 3, 2009	3rd generation	MB763LL/A	A1301	802.11a/b/g/n^{*}	Yes	Yes	Dual band (simultaneous) 2.4 GHz and 5 GHz	2×2:2 (in each band)	No	No			
October 20, 2009	4th generation	MC340AM/A	A1354	802.11a/b/g/n	Yes	Yes	Dual band (simultaneous) 2.4 GHz and 5 GHz	3×3:3 (in each band)	Yes, but not over PPPoE	Yes, with latest software			
June 21, 2011	5th generation	MD031LL/A	A1408	802.11a/b/g/n	Yes	Yes	Dual band (simultaneous) 2.4 GHz and 5 GHz	3×3:3 (in each band)	Yes, but not over PPPoE	Yes, with latest software	ARM926E-S rev 1 (ARM9E-S core)	128 MB	16 MB
June 10, 2013	6th generation	ME918LL/A	A1521	802.11a/b/g/n/ac^{**}	Yes	Yes	Dual band (simultaneous) 2.4 GHz and 5 GHz	3×3:3 (in each band)	Yes, but not over PPPoE	Yes	BCM53019 (dual Cortex-A9)	512 MB	32 MB

*802.11n draft-specification support in 1st- to 3rd-generation models.
**802.11ac draft-specification support in 6th-generation model.
***All models support IPv6 tunnel mode.
****Supported by Apple.

== Discontinuation and support ==
According to a Bloomberg report on November 21, 2016, "Apple Inc. has disbanded its division that develops wireless routers, another move to try to sharpen the company’s focus on consumer products that generate the bulk of its revenue, according to people familiar with the matter."

In an April 2018 statement to 9to5Mac, Apple announced the discontinuation of its AirPort line, leaving the consumer router market. Apple continued supporting the AirPort Extreme.

== See also ==
- List of router firmware projects
- AirPort Express
