= List of Android TV devices =

The following is a list of devices running the Android TV operating system developed by Google.

== Commercial devices ==
- Chromecast with Google TV (Google TV device) (discontinued)
- Google TV Streamer
- Nexus Player (discontinued)
- Nvidia Shield TV
- Mediabox Maverick (South Africa)
- Razer Forge TV (discontinued)
- Xiaomi TV, Xiaomi Mi Box, Mi Box S, Mi TV Stick, Xiaomi TV Stick 4K, and Xiaomi TV Box S (2nd Gen).
- Nokia Streaming Box, and Nokia Media Streamer (Europe)
- Walmart Onn Android TV Box
- Realme 4K Smart Google TV Stick and 1080p Smart Android TV Stick (India)
- Akari SMARTBOX (Indonesia)
- Dynalink Android TV Box
- Stream Hub Prime OTT
- vSeeBox and SuperBox

== Devices provided by pay TV operators ==
- Nova EON Smart Box (Greece)
- TVB MyTV SUPER Box (Hong Kong)
- TVB Anywhere Android TV Box
- Polytron Mola Streaming, and PLAY 2 4K Smart Android TV Box (Indonesia)
- IndiHome (Indonesia)
- First Media (Indonesia)
- MNC Play Vision+ TV (Indonesia)
- Nex Parabola NexVidio (Indonesia)
- Transvision XStream (Indonesia)
- StarHub Go Streaming Box, and StarHub TV+ Box (Singapore)
- Singtel TV Box (Singapore)
- Verizon Stream TV
- TiVo Stream 4K
- Foxtel Now Box (Australia)
- Vodafone TV (Australia) (discontinued)
- Tata Play binge+ (India)
- Airtel Xstream Box, Xstream Stick, and Internet TV (India)
- DishSMRT Hub (India)
- d2h Stream (India)
- Globe Streamwatch 2-in-1 Entertainment Box, and Globe Xtreme Prepaid (Philippines)
- Sky EVO (Philippines)
- Converge VISION Xperience Box (Philippines)
- Cignal Play TV Box (Philippines)
- PLDT StreamTV Box (Philippines)
- Proximus Android TV Box (Belgium)
- unifi Plus Box (Note: also known as unifi TV Plus Box) (Malaysia)
- VMedia VBox Quad, VBox Max, VBox Ultra (Canada)
- Bell Fibe TV Box, and Streamer (Canada)
- DirecTV Gemini/Gemini Air (United States)
- Dish Network Hopper Plus
