= TuneIn =

American audio streaming service

- TuneIn app running on a smartphone
- Original author: Ben Alexander
- Developers: TuneIn Holdings, Inc.
- Release: 2002; 24 years ago
- Platform: List of platforms: Mobile apps and devices; iOS; Android; watchOS; Wear OS; BlackBerry; Microsoft Windows; PlayStation Vita; Desktop client; Microsoft Windows; Game console; PlayStation 3; PlayStation 4; PlayStation 5; Xbox One; Xbox Series X/S; Ouya; Smart radios and speakers; Logitech Squeezebox; Sonos; Amazon Echo; Harman Kardon Invoke; Google Home; Nexus Player; Bose; HEOS by Denon; iHome; Smart TVs; Panasonic; Samsung; Polaroid; Google TV; Android TV; Digital media player; Amazon Fire TV; Roku; Boxee; Chromecast; Cars; Ford; General Motors; Tesla; BMW; MINI; Aftermarket car stereo devices; JVC; Parrot; Clarion
- Available in: 22 languages
- Type: Content delivery; Digital rights management; Audio streaming service
- License: Proprietary software
- Website: tunein.com

TuneIn (formerly and also known as TuneIn Radio) is an American internet radio and podcasting service owned by Canadian media company Stingray Group. The service offers access to various radio stations (including terrestrial and online radio stations), as well as on-demand audio content such as podcasts and audiobooks.

== History ==
The company was first established by Bill Moore in 2002 as RadioTime; its initial product was a directory of internet radio stations, which it licensed to third-parties such as Sonos. The company also produced a USB FM tuner for PCs. In March 2010, RadioTime and BMW marque Mini announced that it would offer the ability to stream internet radio over the Mini Connected in-car entertainment system using an iPhone; Mini stated that it was the first automaker to offer internet radio capabilities in a production vehicle.

In September 2010, RadioTime acquired the iOS internet radio app TuneIn Radio, which had used RadioTime's directory. At this point, the company pivoted to targeting the consumer market via TuneIn, and hired its creator Ben Alexander to continue developing the app for the company. It also raised $6 million in new funding from Sequoia Capital.

By June 2012, TuneIn had over 30 million monthly active users across various platforms (with a 267% year-over-year increase on mobile devices), including its website, Android, iOS, and other internet-connected devices such as vehicles and smart TVs. In August 2012, TuneIn raised $16 million in new funding.

In 2017, TuneIn raised $50 million and was valued at $500 million. In 2020, the company received a new investment by Innovation Ventures, and hired former Audible executive Richard Stern as its new CEO.

In November 2025, Canadian digital audio and radio broadcaster Stingray Group announced its intent to acquire TuneIn for $175 million. The acquisition was completed in December 2025.

== Features ==
The TuneIn platform allows users to stream live and on-demand digital audio content, such as radio stations, podcasts, and sports play-by-play. It is available via TuneIn's website, as well as apps for various smartphones, tablets, smart speakers, digital media players, and other connected devices.

TuneIn is available for free in an ad-supported version, as well as a "Pro" version that removes display and preroll advertising. Initially, Pro users were also able to record any content played through the TuneIn service, but the feature was first discontinued in the UK in early 2017, with a global discontinuation following on September 14, 2020, citing legal issues.

In April 2015, the service launched a subscription known as "TuneIn Premium", which adds access to ad-free versions of stations (including dedicated premium streams from content partners, and automatic substitution of ads with alternate music selections provided by TuneIn), as well as premium spoken word content such as audiobooks and live sports broadcasts.

In March 2018, TuneIn launched "TuneIn Live", a discounted subset of TuneIn Premium exclusive to Amazon Alexa (including Echo products) that was focused on spoken word content such as news, podcasts, audiobooks, and sports. TuneIn Live was discontinued for new subscribers in April 2022, in favor of offering the full TuneIn Premium service on the Alexa platform; existing subscribers were grandfathered under the previous pricing.

== Content ==
The platform has deals with various broadcasters of sports, news, talk, and music worldwide such as ESPN Radio, NPR, Public Radio Exchange (PRX), CBC / Radio-Canada, C-SPAN Radio, All India Radio, Emmis Communications, Hearst Radio, iHeartMedia, Cox Media Group, Urban One, American General Media, Bonneville International, Beasley Media Group, Saga Communications, Lotus Communications, Alpha Media, Connoisseur Media, Mid-West Family Broadcasting, SummitMedia, Midwest Communications, Steel City Media, Lotus Communications, Cumulus Media, Audacy, Inc., WVRC Media, Bristol Broadcasting Company, L.M. Communications, Mvyradio, Wu-Tang Radio (Wu World Radio), ABC Radio and Regional Content (Australia), Bonneville International, Sport Your Argument, Talksport, and Westwood One Podcast Network.

On June 25, 2018, Audacy, Inc. (previously Entercom) announced that it would move online streaming of its stations from TuneIn to its then-named in-house Radio.com platform as an initiative of CBS radio. In turn, Cumulus Media joined the TuneIn platform on August 9, 2018.

On July 29, 2021, TuneIn and iHeartMedia announced a partnership, enabling TuneIn to distribute iHeartMedia's digital stations. The deal also granted TuneIn access to local advertising demand from iHeartMedia's monetization assets.

In October 2018, TuneIn partnered with MSNBC to handle advertising sales for its original podcast Bag Man.

In January 2022, TuneIn launched TuneIn On Air, which allows non-profit broadcasters, podcasters and other long-form content creators to access the company's apps and connected devices for digital distribution of their content.

On June 21, 2023, Audacy signed a partnership with TuneIn, returning all of its stations—including the former CBS Radio stations—to the platform, as well as adding its podcast library to the service.

=== Music ===
In May 2018, the company announced it would stream concerts exclusively from several summer music festivals including Outside Lands Music and Arts Festival (San Francisco), Newport Jazz Festival (Newport, RI), Hangout Fest (Gulf Shores, Alabama), Firefly Music Festival (Dover, Delaware), and the Newport Folk Festival (Newport, RI).

In September 2018, Cathleen Robertson, better known as DJ Carisma of KRRL, joined TuneIn to head Hip-Hop/R&B curation and artist relations initiatives. DJ Carisma launched and hosted "The Element" and "The Element West" as part of this initiative.

=== Sports ===
In August 2015, TuneIn announced deals with Major League Baseball, the Premier League and the Bundesliga for live play-by-play coverage as part of its new Premium service. The deal also included the ability to cover minor league affiliates. In October 2015, the NFL announced a deal with TuneIn to broadcast live, play-by-play coverage of all NFL games to its premium subscribers.

On December 22, 2015, the National Hockey League announced a partnership with TuneIn beginning January 1 (coinciding with the 2016 NHL Winter Classic), under which the service would provide live and on-demand streams of all NHL radio broadcasts at no charge. As part of the agreement, dedicated stations were established for each team (including game broadcasts and other team-related content such as recaps, and events press conferences), and TuneIn widget was added to NHL.com. The content has since been moved to TuneIn Premium. On September 22, 2022, the Anaheim Ducks announced that they would eschew a terrestrial radio deal and move their radio broadcasts exclusively to TuneIn via a station known as "Ducks Stream", which would carry live play by play and other team-related content (such as team-produced podcasts).

On February 15, 2019, the Oakland Athletics announced a deal with TuneIn to launch "A's Cast", an internet radio station that would carry Athletics-related content, as well as in-market radio broadcasts of Athletics games beginning in the 2020 season; the agreement eschewed a traditional flagship station and left games unavailable over-the-air in the Bay Area, although the Athletics continued to maintain a radio network in other parts of the team's market. However, in July 2020, only one week into the shortened season, the team opted out of the TuneIn agreement and signed with iHeartMedia instead, with KNEW as flagship station and A's Cast moved to iHeartRadio. The team cited that terrestrial radio was more "inclusive" to fans, as well as criticism from listeners who found the streaming-only model to be confusing (including some who believed they would need a TuneIn Premium subscription to listen to A's games, even though this was not the case).

On November 4, 2021, TuneIn announced a partnership with British broadcaster News Broadcasting to carry Talksport on the platform.

In March 2022, TuneIn signed a multi-year agreement with Major League Baseball to be an official audio partner, giving premium users access to live and on-demand play by play of all games, post-game analysis, and Spanish language broadcasts.

On August 5, 2022, TuneIn announced they would carry all English Premier League matches.

=== Audiobooks ===
In August 2015, the service launched deals with book publishers, including Penguin Random House and HarperCollins, to provide an audiobook library. In December 2017, TuneIn announced that it would remove audiobooks as of January 15, 2018. However, as of July 7, 2023, TuneIn continues to offer audiobooks via its website.

== Legal issues ==
In 2017, TuneIn was sued by Sony Music UK and Warner Music UK, alleging copyright infringement by offering access to international radio stations not licensed for distribution in the United Kingdom. The companies also took issue with a feature in its premium tier, which was later disabled in the country, that allowed users to record broadcasts. In November 2019, the English High Court ruled that, despite TuneIn's arguments that the premium feature in question was merely an aggregator similar to a search engine, the TuneIn service infringed the labels' rights by making streams not licensed in the country available to its users (an infringement of the exclusive right to communicate a work to the public, under EU copyright law). The court granted a request for an appeal.

TuneIn has largely closed its doors to new radio station submissions since around 2018, making only rare exceptions. As a result, new stations can no longer be added through the usual submission process. While existing listings can still be updated, newly launched stations are generally unable to join the platform.

In September 2020, TuneIn began to geoblock all international radio stations for users in the United Kingdom, citing the earlier court order.

On March 29, 2021, the Court of Appeal upheld the High Court decision, ruling that TuneIn infringed the right of communication to the public.

In May 2022, TuneIn removed United Kingdom stations that were not registered with the music licensing bodies PRS and PPL.
