= Movies & TV =

Movies & TV may refer to:

- Microsoft Movies & TV
- Google TV (service), formerly known as Google Play Movies & TV
