= Nexus Player =

Streaming media player co-developed by Google and Asus

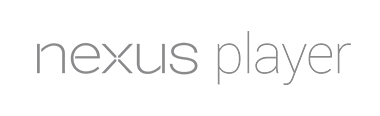
- Developer: Google, Asus
- Manufacturer: Asus
- Product family: Google Nexus
- Type: Digital media player, set-top box, microconsole
- Released: November 3, 2014
- Introductory price: USD $99; GBP £79
- Discontinued: May 24, 2016
- Operating system: Original: Android 5.0 "Lollipop"; Current: Android 8.0 "Oreo"
- CPU: 1.8 GHz quad-core Intel Atom Z3560; Imagination PowerVR G6430 Graphics 2D/3D Engine (1080p)
- Memory: 1 GB LPDDR3
- Storage: 8 GB internal eMMC
- Input: Android phones/tablets, Android Wear, Nexus Player remote, Asus Gamepad, Bluetooth audio devices and HIDs
- Connectivity: Wi-Fi (IEEE 802.11ac 2x2 MIMO); Bluetooth; Micro-USB; HDMI; USB OTG
- Online services: Google Play; Netflix; HBO Go; Hulu Plus; YouTube; USA Today; CBS News; Pandora Radio
- Dimensions: 120 mm (4.7 in) diameter 20 mm (0.79 in) H
- Weight: 235 g (8.3 oz)
- Predecessor: Nexus Q
- Successor: Chromecast with Google TV
- Website: Asus website

The Nexus Player is a discontinued digital media player that was co-developed by Google, Intel and Asus. It is the second media player in the Google Nexus family of consumer devices. Originally running the Android 5.0 ("Lollipop") operating system, it is the first device to employ the Android TV platform. The Nexus player supports Google Cast, the feature for selecting and controlling media playback on a television that was first introduced by Chromecast. Sales of the Nexus Player were discontinued in May 2016, and product support ended in March 2018.

== History ==
The Nexus Player was unveiled on October 15, 2014, and made available for pre-order two days later on the Google Play Store for $99, and later made available for purchase at retail stores in the US.

On May 24, 2016, Google discontinued direct sales of the Nexus Player. In May 2017, Google announced that Google Assistant was coming to the Nexus Player later in the year. In November 2017, the device was updated with the Google Assistant feature through the monthly security update. In March 2018, Google confirmed that the Nexus Player would not receive Android 9 Pie and that security updates had also ended for the device.

In August 2018, Android Headlines reported that some Nexus Player users were facing an issue where they became inoperable.

== Hardware ==
It is powered by a 1.8 GHz quad-core Intel Atom Z3560 processor with 1 GB of LPDDR3 RAM and 8 GB of internal eMMC storage.

== Remote control ==
The Nexus Player comes bundled with a Bluetooth remote control, with a direction pad & middle enter button, a back, home and play/pause button. It also features a button to activate the Google Search application to search for content by speaking through the remote's built-in microphone. The device can also be controlled by any Android smartphone with Google Play services. The app also features a Wear OS counterpart to allow remote input from compatible smartwatches.

== Features ==
The Nexus Player and Android TV allow consumers to use an HDTV set to play music, watch video originating from Internet services or a local network, and play games (Emulators and Android Games). The primary interface is interacted with using a remote with a D-pad dial and 5 buttons. The remote also includes a microphone for voice search functions within supported apps and the main system interface. Android TV can be paired with Bluetooth gaming controllers to interact with the system interface / applications, as well as, playing games. Android TV also includes all features and streaming capabilities of the Chromecast device.

- Users can access the Google Play store directly through the user interface to rent / buy movies, TV shows and stream play music.
- Live Channels by Google allows users to stream from media sources including the HDHomeRun TV tuner with TV Guide functionality
- Kodi allows users to access a host of applications and content available through Kodi (formerly XBMC)
- Netflix
- Hulu Plus
- YouTube
- TED
- HDHomeRun App
- VLC media player
- FX Now
- Sling TV
- Disney Movies Anywhere
- Crackle
- Epix
- Plex
- HGTV Watch
- PBS Kids Video
- CNET
- CBS News
- Bloomberg TV+
- HuffPost Live for Android TV
- TuneIn Radio
- iHeartRadio
- Songza TV
- CBS Sports
- Red Bull TV
- MLB.TV
- Vevo
- Showtime
- Vimeo
- Vudu

== FCC difficulties ==
During its initial days on sale, the Nexus Player was pulled from the Google Play Store because it had not passed FCC certification. Two days later, the device returned to the Play Store after receiving said certification.

== See also ==
- Nexus Q
- Chromebit
- Apple TV, a similar product from Apple Inc.
- Roku, a similar product from Roku, Inc.
- Amazon Fire TV, a similar product from Amazon
