= BlogTalkRadio =

Podcast platform

- Official Logo
- Website type: Internet radio network
- Dissolved: January 31, 2025; 19 months ago
- Owners: Alan Levy; Bob Charish
- Key people: Alan Levy (CEO); Andy Toh (general manager); Bob Charish (COO); Wicem Gindrey (speaker from France)
- Parent: Cinchcast, Inc.
- Website: blogtalkradio.com (Archived on January 31, 2025)
- Commercial: Yes
- Registration: Free, required to host, optional to listen
- Launched: August 2006; 20 years ago
- Current status: Defunct

BlogTalkRadio was a web-based platform operating from August 2006 to January 2025. It allowed podcasters and radio sites and talk show hosts to create live and on-demand talk format content for distribution on the web and podcast distribution channels. It offered a web-based 'studio' that allowed its content creators to host multi-participant broadcasts using a computer and a phone.

== Development ==
After setting up a blog to update his family on his ailing father, Alan Levy, a former accountant and telecommunications executive, launched the service in August 2006, as a way to allow audio content creators to communicate directly with their audiences in real time.

== Service ==
This service allowed up to five callers at a time, although unlimited participants could listen in. Shows streamed directly from the host page during live broadcasts, and were archived as podcasts. Previous shows could be streamed, downloaded directly or subscribed to as podcasts via RSS through any podcatcher like Juice, Stitcher or iTunes. This service also provided promotional badges and flash player code for placement on blogs, Twitter, Facebook and other Social networking sites.

=== Cinch ===
Cinch allowed anyone to dial a "Cinch number" and record a podcast with a built-in RSS feed without any preregistration or prior setup.

== Reception ==
In 2008, Howard Kurtz, in his "Media Notes" column in The Washington Post, wrote of BlogTalkRadio that "The process is nearly idiot-proof," and called it "a populist force in cyberspace."

Also in 2008, Condé Nast Portfolio referred to BlogTalkRadio as a site that "has become the dominant player in the latest media trend, one that allows anyone with a Web connection to host a talk show on any topic at any time of day. It is the newest form of new media; the audio version of the internet blog." In the same article, however, the profitability of the service was called into question as BlogTalkRadio was then operating at a loss.

== Closure ==
In November 2024, BlogTalkRadio emailed its customers to announce that the platform would shut down on January 31, 2025. According to domain monitoring data from UpDownToday, the domain blogtalkradio.com remained accessible beyond the announced shutdown date, with availability recorded as of July 30, 2025.

== See also ==
- Justin.tv
- Livestream
- Lifecasting (video stream)
- Tinychat
- Ustream
- Sport Your Argument

== Notable networks ==
- The Motley Fool
- Rob Has a Podcast
- SB Nation
- Kyle Kulinski
