= Sport Your Argument =

Sport Your Argument is a weekly sports talk radio show based in Washington, D.C., hosted by Matt Potter and Casey Angel, broadcast on Yahoo Sports Radio and the TuneIn Radio networks. Founded in 2011, the two-hour show is heard nationally during Wednesday broadcasts, at 7:00 PM (EST). Sport Your Argument features commentary on the sports world top stories, the incorporation of pop culture into typical sports debates and interviews with other sports talk personalities such as Stephen Edwards of MLBlogs Network & First Take UK and Alex Lowe of Other League. The hosts are known for creating games to help interact with the audience on-air, taking questions on social media (Facebook & Twitter), as well as their comically over-dramatized personalities to bring fans closer to the topics and discussions of the day.

Sport Your Argument was previously heard on Blog Talk Radio and Spark Sports Online.

In early 2016, Sport Your Argument announced it would be expanding to Yahoo! Sports Radio online.
