= Devita Saraf =

Indian business women

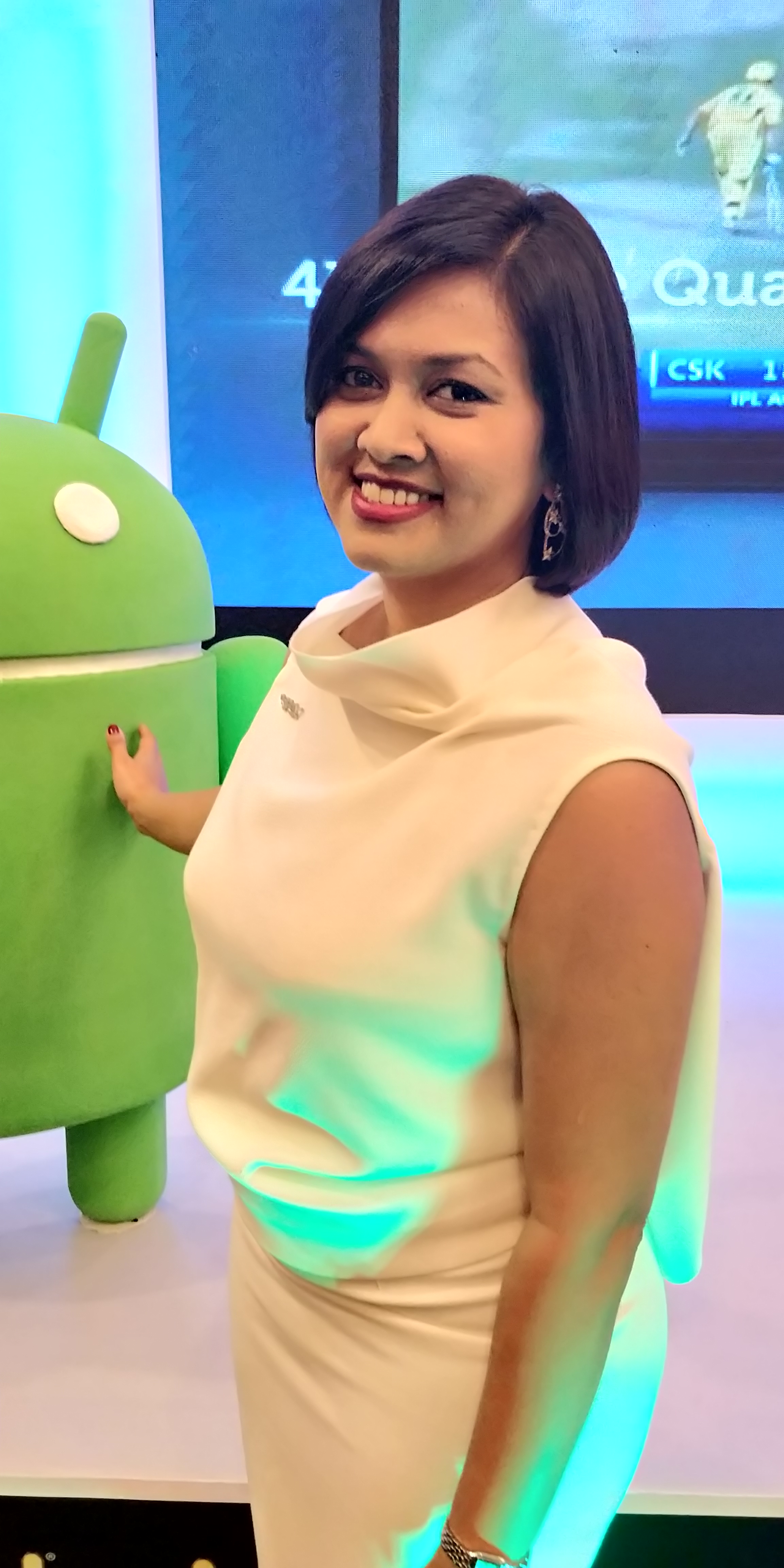
- Born: Devita Saraf; 25 June 1981 (age 45); Mumbai, India
- Education: H.R. College of Commerce and Economics, Mumbai, India; University of Southern California
- Occupations: Chairman and CEO, Vu Televisions
- Parent(s): Rajkumar Saraf; Vijayrani Saraf
- Website: www.devitasaraf.com

Devita Saraf is an Indian business woman, born in Mumbai, India. She is the founder, chairman and CEO of Vu Televisions. She is the daughter of Rajkumar Saraf.

== Early life ==
Saraf was born in Mumbai, India. Her father, Rajkumar Saraf, was chairman of Zenith Computers. She attended Queen Mary School, Mumbai. She later attended the H.R. College of Commerce and Economics and the University of Southern California, where she received a BA in business administration.

== Career ==
She founded the company at the age of 24 after completing her bachelor's degree in Business Administration from the University of Southern California. She has also studied management of technology at the University of California, Berkeley, and game theory and strategic thinking at the London School of Economics. She is also pursuing the OPM program at Harvard Business School.

=== Zenith ===
Saraf started her career at age 16, under the guidance of her father at Zenith Computers, and was named director of marketing when she was 21. In 2006 Saraf went from being the head of marketing to CEO.

=== Vu Technologies ===
At age 24, Saraf started Vu Technologies, which sells high-end LED TVs. While Zenith was mass technology focused, Vu sells innovative luxury items. In October 2014, the Bombay High Court sealed the premises of the Andheri-based office of Vu Technologies after it fraudulently showed 200 employees in their affidavit but only 32 were found on premises in a visit and in the muster roll for September–October 2014.

=== Others ===
Saraf has been a National Co-chair and Executive Committee Member in the Federation of Indian Chambers of Commerce and Industry (FICCI) Young Leaders Forum. She was also the founder and Chair of the Young Bombay Forum which was part of Bombay Chamber of Commerce and Industry. She is the member of Mensa, an international society for people with high IQ.

She was also a columnist for The Wall Street Journal. In 2017, Saraf bought a full-page ad in the Times of India newspaper, where she congratulated Donald Trump on becoming President of the United States. The ad attracted mixed reviews on social media.

== Controversy ==
The High Court of Bombay in a case filed by The Bank of New York Mellon, convicted her father, and the promoters of Zenith Infotech of siphoning company funds to personnel accounts and has directed the Board for Industrial and Financial Reconstruction Government of India (BIFR) to act in accordance with its regulations.

The Securities and Exchange Board of India (SEBI) accused Zenith Infotech Limited and its six promoters of fraudulent removal of funds to personnel accounts without notice to shareholders, and as of 25 March 2013, SEBI prevented the promoters from accessing the securities market or trading in securities in any manner. The named six promoters included by SEBI are Saraf; her father Rajkumar Saraf; Akash Kumar Saraf; Vijayrani Saraf; VU Technologies; and Zenith Technologies.

== Books ==
Year	Title
2012	Business Czarinas – S. N. Chary
2016	Most Powerful Women in India – Prem Ahluwalia
2018	Daughters of Legacy – Rinku Paul

== Speaker ==
Year	Event
2013	Wharton-India Economic Forum – Philadelphia, PA, USA
2016	Tomorrow's India Summit – Seoul, Korea
2016	Istanbul Talks: Entrepreneurship Summit – Istanbul, Turkey
2018	TEDxGateway – Mumbai, India
2020	Fortune Next 500 Summit – Mumbai, India
