= Chromebit =

Stick PC running Chrome OS

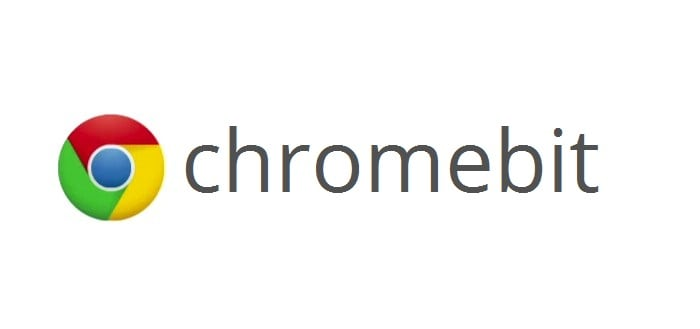

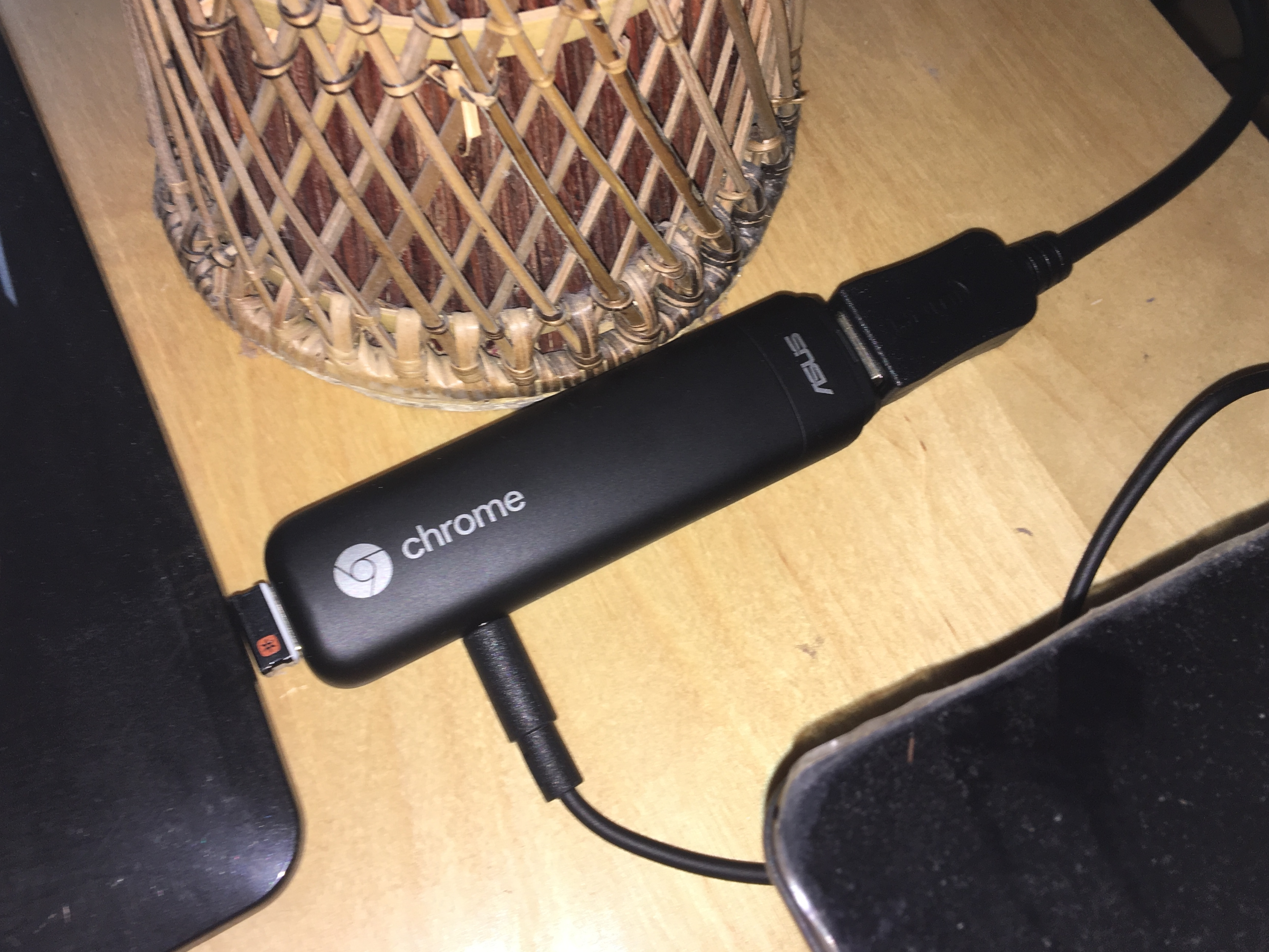
- The Asus Chromebit installed to a TV
- Manufacturer: Asus; Google
- Introduced: March 31, 2015; 11 years ago
- Cost: US $85
- Type: Stick PC
- Memory: 2 GB
- Connection: Wi-Fi, Bluetooth
- Ports: HDMI, USB
- Weight: Asus Chromebit 75 g (2.6 oz)
- Dimensions: Asus Chromebit 123 × 31 × 17 mm (4.8 × 1.2 × 0.67 in)

The Chromebit is a discontinued stick PC running Google's ChromeOS. It was able to be plugged into any display via HDMI to act as a personal computer. Keyboards and mice were able to be connected over Bluetooth or Wi-Fi. The device was announced in April 2015 and began shipping November 2015. The Chromebit no longer received updates after November 2020.

== Functionality ==
A Chromebit uses a display with an HDMI port to control a desktop variant of the Chromebook netbook, which runs Google's ChromeOS operating system. ChromeOS primarily supports a single application, a web browser, thereby relying heavily on an Internet connection for software functionality and data storage.

Chromebits have a superficial resemblance to the Chromecast, another Google device, but whereas the Chromecast is designed to display multimedia and web content from an Android or ChromeOS device on a television or other large-screen display, the Chromebit is a self-contained personal computer. The device competes against the Intel Compute Stick, which offers similar plug-in functionality using two other operating systems, Windows 8.1 and Windows 10.

== Technology ==
Internally, the first Chromebit resembles a standard Chromebook laptop. The device features 802.11ac Wi-Fi and Bluetooth 4.0, as well as a USB 2.0 port at one end. The other end swivels, enabling it to fit into a variety of HDMI slots. The Chromebit has a total RAM capacity of 2 gigabytes and 16 gigabytes of flash memory.

== Availability and models ==
Google announced the Chromebit on March 31, 2015. Google and Asus began shipping the first model that November. The Chromebit no longer received updates after November 2020.

Announced	Brand	Model	Processor	RAM	Storage	Size
March 2015	Asus	Asus Chromebit CS10	Rockchip RK3288	2 GB	16 GB	12 CM
