= Dongle =

Small piece of computer hardware

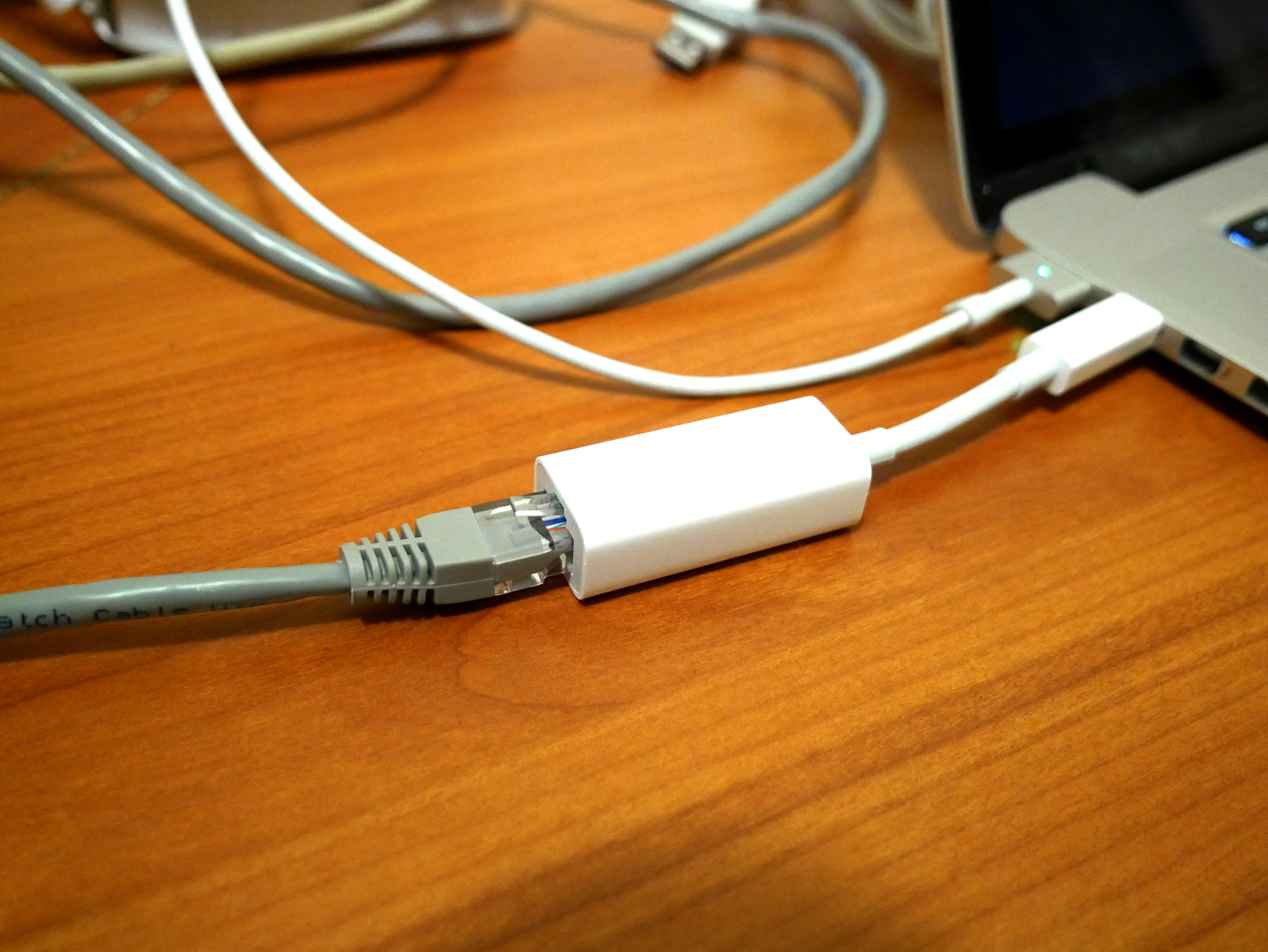
A dongle (center, in white) allowing an ethernet cable (left, in grey) to be connected to a Thunderbolt port on a Macbook laptop (right).

A dongle is a small piece of computer hardware that connects to a port on another device to provide it with additional functionality, or enable a pass-through to such a device that adds functionality.

In computing, the term was initially synonymous with software protection dongles—a form of hardware digital rights management in which a piece of software will only operate if a specified dongle is connected. It typically contains a license key or some other cryptographic protection mechanism and is plugged into the computer while it is running.

The term has since been applied to other forms of devices with a similar form factor, such as:

- adapters that convert ports to handle different types of connectors (such as DVI to VGA for displays, USB-to-serial data communication, and in modern computing, USB-C to other types of ports, and Mobile High-Definition Link)
- USB wireless adapters for standards such as Bluetooth and Wi-Fi
- USB flash drives (more commonly described as "USB stick" or "USB key")
- small form-factor digital media players that plug into HDMI ports (most commonly described as a "media player dongle" or "media player stick")

== Etymology ==
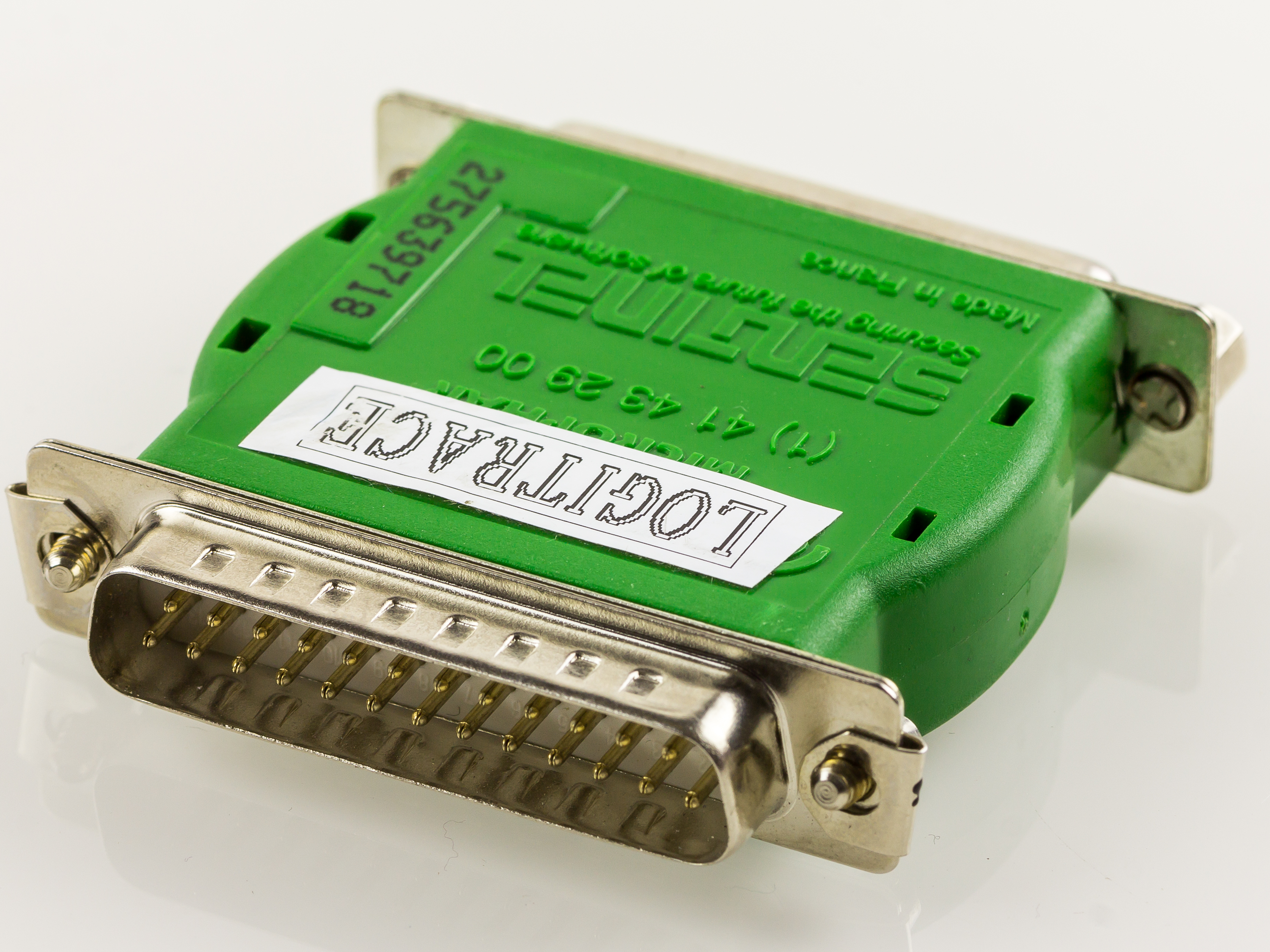
A parallel port adapter

There are varying accounts on the etymology of the word "dongle"; in a 1999 paper, P. B. Schneck stated that the origin was unclear, but that it was possibly a corruption of the word "dangle" (since these devices "dangle" from a port on a PC).

A 1992 Byte magazine advertisement by Rainbow Technologies claimed that dongles were invented by and named after a person named "Don Gall", one of Andrew Fuschi's best friends, spawning an urban legend. Linguist Ben Zimmer noted that the claim was likely a by-product of their "tongue-in-cheek" marketing style, and "was so egregiously false that the company happily owned up to it as a marketing ploy when pressed by Eric S. Raymond, who maintains the Jargon File, an online lexicon of hacker slang."

== Examples ==
=== Copy protection ===
Software protection dongles are typically used to help prevent unauthorized use and copying of certain forms of software. Initially using ports such as the serial port or parallel port, most are now in USB format.

=== Small peripheral appliances ===
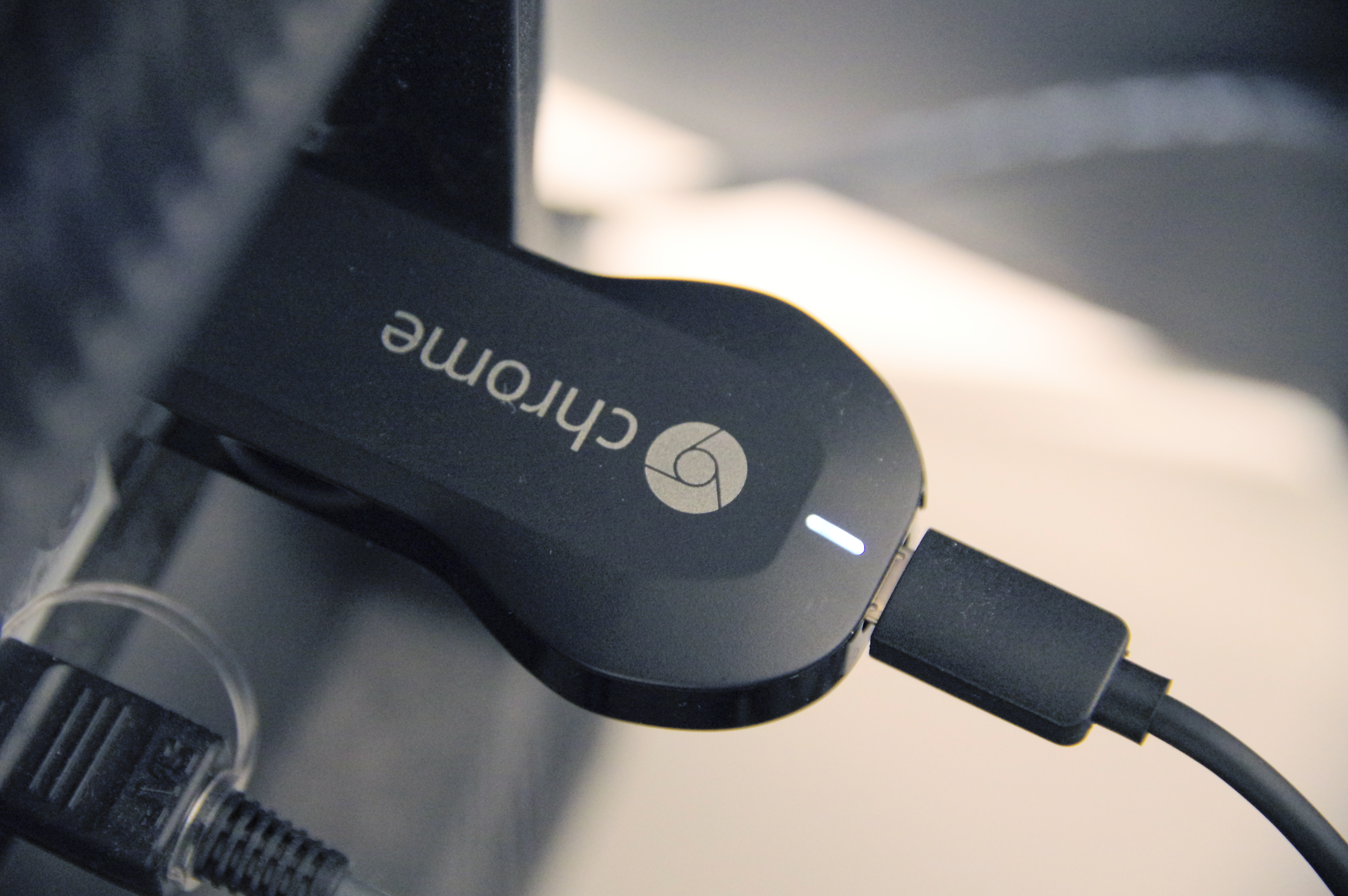
A Chromecast stick plugged into the HDMI port of a TV. The cable attached to the other end is the USB power supply.

In the mid-to-late 2010s, the dongle form factor was extended to digital media players with a small, stick-like form factor—such as Chromecast and Fire TV Stick—that are designed to plug directly into an HDMI port on a television or AV receiver (powered via Micro USB connection to the television itself or an AC adapter), in contrast to a larger set-top box-style device. Single-board computers, such as the Intel Compute Stick, have also been produced in a similar means.

=== Adapters ===
- Very short cables that connect relatively large jacks to smaller plugs allow cables to be easily installed and removed from equipment with limited space available for connectors.

=== Other ===
- Cassette adapters enable cassette-radios to allow AUX in, as with iPod/MP3 player/smartphone/portable CD player.
- Personal FM transmitters allow content from a portable media player, portable CD player, smartphone, portable cassette player, or other portable audio system to be heard on an FM radio.
- IDE/PATA connectivity can be re-channeled with some dongles:
  - Both floppy disk and hard disk drives have been emulated on solid-state "dongles" to ensure legacy recognition, allowing SD cards to serve software to old Commodore 64 and Apple II era computers.
- The Nintendo DS contains a cartridge slot used primarily for Game Boy Advance games, but was also used as a slot for add-on dongles such as the Rumble Pak.
- USB host connectivity grants more flexibility to computer-based devices
  - Bluetooth
  - legacy game controllers have special adapters
  - GPS receivers
  - SD card readers
  - Flash drives
  - Mobile broadband modems
  - Network interface controllers
- Older cars that "externalized" their CD players and changers from the head unit can now use "emulators" that allow USB and SD cards with MP3s and other audio files to be recognized as "tracks" to the CD control unit circuitry.
- Adapters that convert miniature implementations of an interface to the full-sized equivalent, or are required to provide the electrical and mechanical interfaces for expansion cards that cannot physically accommodate them (such as PCMCIA, Compact Flash and ExpressCard expansion cards which are just millimetres thick, too small for a standard connector without having the connector and housing extend beyond the dimensions specified by the standard). Although commonly referred to as "dongles", the alternative term "Pig-tail" is favoured by some in the IT industry, due to the appearance of a full-sized connection element, with a short, thin wire extending, somewhat reminiscent of the rear of porcine animals. The term is somewhat descriptive, and allows one to avoid using the word dongle except for its original meaning.

== See also ==
- Emulator
- Repurposing
- Reverse engineering
