= Google TV (service) =

Digital distribution service for movies and television

- Developer: Google
- Release: September 2020; 6 years ago

Stable release(s) [±]
- Android: 4.39.4536 (Build 917279442.1) / May 22, 2026; 5 months ago
- iOS (Note: Including iPadOS): 3.33.1 / June 12, 2026; 5 months ago
- Operating system: Android 7+; iOS 17+; Android TV; Android XR; Web
- Type: Digital distribution
- Website: tv.google

Google TV, formerly known as Google Play Movies & TV, is a digital distribution service for movies and television series developed by Google. Launched in 2011 as part of the Google Play product line, the service offers search and discovery of video titles across multiple streaming services, including rental or purchase options, alongside watchlist features for accessing titles from eligible devices and platforms. In September 2020, it was relaunched as Google TV.

The purchased or rented video titles can be watched by a signed-in user on Android TV devices, Google TV devices, the Google TV mobile app (Android and iOS), and YouTube. The Google TV mobile app can download video for offline watching. The search, discover and watchlist options are also available on the Google Search website, the Google TV app on mobile devices, TVs with Google Assistant, Google TV devices, and YouTube app and website as YouTube Movies and TV.

== History ==
=== Google Play Movies & TV ===
The Google Movies service was launched in May 2011. It was rebranded under Google Play in March 2012.

Movies were introduced in Korea in September 2012, with further rollouts of movies in Australia, Canada, the United Kingdom, France, and Spain in October 2012; movies in Brazil and Russia in December 2012; movies in India and Mexico in March 2013; TV shows in the United Kingdom in July 2013; and movies in Italy in November 2013. A major expansion of movies was made in 13 new countries in December 2013, and 38 new countries in March 2014. Subsequent rollouts took place for movies in Belgium, Philippines, Switzerland, and Uganda in May 2014; movies in Ireland in July 2014; movies in Austria in September 2014; movies in Bosnia-Herzegovina, Cyprus, Hungary, Iceland, Macedonia, Malta, Slovenia, Taiwan, and Ukraine in November 2014; movies in Indonesia, Malaysia, and Singapore in July 2015; movies in Turkey in March 2016; and movies in Bahrain, Egypt, Jordan, Kuwait, Lebanon, Oman, Qatar, Saudi Arabia, the United Arab Emirates, and Vietnam in November 2016.

With several video titles available in HD, Google added a 4K Ultra HD video option for select titles in December 2016, and began offering content in 4K HDR quality in the United States and Canada in July 2017.

=== Google TV ===
The Google TV service was announced in September 2020 along with the launch of Chromecast with Google TV having an updated interface with service features available first on it and to be made available later on some Android TVs. At the same time, the Google Play Movies & TV app was also updated with same interface as well as related features and was renamed Google TV on Android mobile devices in the United States. The Google TV user interface is deeply integrated with the Google TV video service.

In September 2020, the Google Play Movies & TV mobile app was renamed Google TV and related features were added to it, coinciding with the announcement of Google TV interface available first on the new Chromecast.

In March 2021, users were informed that the app used on several TVs would no longer be available in June 2021 and users should use the YouTube app instead.

In April 2021, Google began to deprecate the Google Play Movies & TV app on Roku, LG, Samsung, and Vizio smart TVs, the app to shut down on July 15, redirecting users on these platforms to the YouTube app.

In March 2022, it was announced that Google Play Movies & TV was moving to Google TV and starting in May 2022, the Google TV app would be home for buying, renting, and watching movies and shows on Android mobile device or tablet. It was also announced that Movies & TV would no longer be supported on the Google Play app and Google Play would continue to be store for apps, games, and books.

The service expanded to iOS in June 2022.

In December 2023, it was announced that Google Play Movies & TV would be removed on Android TV and the Google Play website on January 7, 2024; the web version would move to YouTube.

In October 2025, 3D content became available on the platform for the first time.

== Geographic availability ==
Geographic availability of movies on Google TV

Geographic availability of TV shows on Google TV

Now part of Google TV service, movies on Google Play are available in 120 countries.

The full country list includes: Albania, Angola, Antigua and Barbuda, Argentina, Armenia, Aruba, Australia, Austria, Azerbaijan, Bahrain, Belarus, Belgium, Belize, Benin, Bolivia, Bosnia-Herzegovina, Botswana, Brazil, Burkina Faso, Cambodia, Canada, Cape Verde, Chile, Colombia, Costa Rica, Croatia, Cyprus, Czech Republic, Denmark, Dominican Republic, Ecuador, Egypt, El Salvador, Estonia, Finland, Fiji, France, Gabon, Germany, Greece, Guatemala, Haiti, Honduras, Hong Kong, Hungary, Iceland, India, Indonesia, Ireland, Italy, Ivory Coast, Jamaica, Japan, Jordan, Kazakhstan, Kyrgyzstan, Kuwait, Lao People's Democratic Republic, Latvia, Lebanon, Lithuania, Luxembourg, Macedonia, Malaysia, Mali, Malta, Mauritius, Mexico, Moldova, Namibia, Netherlands, Nepal, New Zealand, Nicaragua, Niger, Norway, Oman, Panama, Papua New Guinea, Paraguay, Peru, Philippines, Poland, Portugal, Qatar, Rwanda, Russia, Saudi Arabia, Senegal, Singapore, Slovakia, Slovenia, South Africa, South Korea, Spain, Sri Lanka, Sweden, Switzerland, Taiwan, Tajikistan, Tanzania, Thailand, Togo, Trinidad and Tobago, Turkey, Turkmenistan, Uganda, Ukraine, United Arab Emirates, the United Kingdom, the United States, Uruguay, Uzbekistan, Venezuela, Vietnam, Zambia, Zimbabwe

Also, TV shows are only available in: Australia, Austria, Canada, France, Germany, Japan, Switzerland, the United Kingdom, the United States.

Google TV app is available in: Albania, Angola, Antigua and Barbuda, Argentina, Armenia, Aruba, Australia, Austria, Azerbaijan, Bahrain, Belgium, Belarus, Belize, Benin, Bolivia, Bosnia-Herzegovina, Botswana, Brazil, Burkina Faso, Cambodia, Canada, Cape Verde, Chile, Colombia, Costa Rica, Croatia, Cyprus, Czech Republic, Denmark, Dominican Republic, Ecuador, Egypt, El Salvador, Estonia, Fiji, Finland, France, Gabon, Germany, Greece, Guatemala, Haiti, Honduras, Hong Kong, Hungary, Iceland, India, Indonesia, Ireland, Italy, Ivory Coast, Jamaica, Japan, Jordan, Kazakhstan, Kyrgyzstan, Kuwait, Lao People's Democratic Republic, Latvia, Lebanon, Lithuania, Luxembourg, Macedonia, Malaysia, Mali, Malta, Mauritius, Mexico, Moldova, Namibia, Netherlands, Nepal, New Zealand, Nicaragua, Niger, Norway, Oman, Panama, Papua New Guinea, Paraguay, Peru, Philippines, Poland, Portugal, Qatar, Rwanda, Russia, Saudi Arabia, Senegal, Singapore, Slovakia, Slovenia, South Africa, South Korea, Spain, Sri Lanka, Sweden, Switzerland, Taiwan, Tajikistan, Tanzania, Thailand, Togo, Trinidad and Tobago, Turkey, Turkmenistan, Uganda, Ukraine, United Arab Emirates, Uruguay, Uzbekistan, the United Kingdom, the United States, Venezuela, Vietnam, Zambia, and Zimbabwe.

== Features ==
=== Purchase and library access ===
The Google TV service offers options to rent or buy movies and television shows in various video resolutions including SD, HD, and UHD, as well as 3D, depending on geographic as well as devices and platform availability.

Available content titles can be purchased through a Google TV device or the Google TV app. The purchase feature is not available on iPhone and iPad. The purchased content is added to the library associated with the signed-in Google Account.

Content titles purchased through Google Play Movies & TV or through YouTube can also be found in library associated with the same Google Account and can be accessed using Google TV on eligible devices and platforms.

The Shop tab on Android TV devices can also be used to explore and buy or rent video titles distributed under Google TV service.

=== Offline downloads ===
A user can download a previously bought video on up to five devices and a rented video on one device at a time using the Google TV app. Users can't download videos onto a Google TV device.

=== Watchlist ===
Movies and shows can be added to a watchlist to find or watch content later. The watchlist is associated with the user account and updates across devices of a signed-in account when some content is added to it. Certain content from some streaming services cannot be added to watchlist. Content titles can be watched, removed or added on watchlist from a Google TV device, Google TV app, or from Google Search in a web browser.

=== Recommendations and content preferences ===
In agreement with partners, Google provides recommended content to users of the Google TV service with the app or dedicated Google TV devices. Google sets default ordering and selections for streaming services based on app popularity, installed apps, user saved services, and contractual agreements with Google's partners.

A user can add streaming services by selecting from list of available services using Google TV app or a Google TV device in order to get more content recommendations from those services. These options aren't available for all shows and movies on every streaming service. Streaming services can be linked or unlinked to a user's Google account.

If a user is signed in with their Google Account and Web & App Activity is turned on, Google makes recommendations based on several factors which include:

- What is added to the watchlist
- What is watched on Google Play, Google TV, and Android TV
- Trailers watched on YouTube
- Content purchased or rented on Google Play, YouTube, Google TV, and Android TV
- Streaming services selected
- Entertainment-related searches on Google Search or with the Google Assistant
- Specific titles liked or disliked on Google Play, Google TV, or Google Search
- Region

A user can set or update content preferences by rating the followed suggested titles. This feature is only available on a Google TV device.

=== Parental controls ===
Parental controls are available on some Google TV devices and regions.

=== Interface ===
Content distributed under Google TV service is made available for discovery on a user interface called Google TV as available on Google TV devices and Google TV mobile app as well as on new user interface called Android TV as available on Android TV devices.

== Platforms and devices ==
Google TV can be accessed on different platforms and devices. However, not all features are available on every platform or device. User sign-in is required on each platform to access their content library. This includes the following platforms and devices:

=== Browsers ===
- YouTube website, where ads don't play when a signed in user watch purchased content
- Google Search, where titles can be searched and removed from or added to watchlist
- Earlier, the content was available to access on Google Play website, where HD playback was not supported and content played in SD. HD playback for purchased eligible content was supported using Safari on Mac. Offline download and watching was supported on Chromebook through the Google Chrome extension.

=== Smartphones and tablets ===
- Google TV app, where the purchase feature is not available on iPhone and iPad
- YouTube app

=== Television sets ===
- Android TV devices, where rentals, movies & shows can be accessed through the "Shop" tab
- Movies Anywhere app
- Google TV devices
- YouTube app

=== AR/VR Headsets ===
- Galaxy XR

=== Digital media players ===
The service can be used with access to content through the YouTube app available on media players including the following:

- Amazon Fire TV
- Apple TV
- Chromecast (also supports video casting from Google TV app, Google Play website)
- Nintendo Switch
- Nintendo Switch 2
- PlayStation 4
- PlayStation 5
- Roku
- Xbox One
- Xbox Series X/S

== Google TV devices ==
Select smart TVs and streaming devices have Google TV interface built-in. The Google TV interface has underlying Android TV operating system.

The list of Google TV devices includes the following:

- Chromecast with Google TV
- Google TV Streamer
- select TVs from:
  - Haier
  - Hisense
  - Motorola
  - Nokia
  - OnePlus (OnePlus TV)
  - Onida
  - Panasonic
  - Pensonic
  - Philips
  - Polytron
  - Realme
  - Sharp
  - Sony
  - TCL
  - Toshiba
  - Vu Televisions
  - Xiaomi
