= Android TV =

Android operating system version for television sets and digital media players

- Screenshot Android TV launcher
- Developer: Google
- OS family: Unix-like (Linux)
- Initial release: June 25, 2014; 12 years ago
- Latest release: Android TV 16 / July 27, 2025; 15 months ago
- Marketing target: Smart TVs, digital media players, set-top boxes, USB dongles
- Available in: Multilingual
- Package manager: APK via Google Play
- Kernel type: Monolithic (Linux kernel)
- Preceded by: Google TV
- Succeeded by: Google TV (interface)
- Official website: android.com/tv/

Android TV is an operating system that runs on smart TVs and related entertainment devices including soundbars, set-top boxes, and digital media players. Created and developed by Google, it is a Android distribution with closed-source components. Android TV features a user interface designed around content discovery and voice search, content aggregation from various media apps and services, and integration with other recent Google technologies such as Assistant, Cast, and Knowledge Graph.

The platform was unveiled in June 2014, as a successor to Google TV, available first on the Nexus Player in October. The platform has since been adopted as smart TV middleware by companies such as TCL, Sony, Panasonic, Philips, Sharp, Toshiba, Vu Televisions, Onida, Motorola, Nokia, Hisense, Xiaomi and Haier. Android TV products have also been adopted as set-top boxes by a number of IPTV television providers. The "Operator Tier" certification allows operators to distribute their own custom devices based on the Android TV platform.

== Overview ==
The Android TV platform is an adaptation of the Android OS for set-top boxes and as integrated software on smart TV hardware. It supports media, games, and apps from Google Play, although not all Google Play apps are compatible with Android TV. Some Android TV devices, such as the Nvidia Shield and Razer Forge TV, are also marketed as microconsoles and are bundled with a Bluetooth wireless gamepad.

The Verge characterized Android TV with leveraging Google's Knowledge Graph project; Chromecast compatibility; a larger emphasis on search; closer ties to the Android ecosystem including Google Play and Android Wear; and native support for video games, Bluetooth gamepads, and the Google Play Games framework.

Subsequent releases of Android TV brought new features to the operating system, such as camera support (with Android TV 9), auto low-latency mode for gaming (with Android TV 11), 4K UI, refresh rate switching and text scaling (with Android TV 12).

A special certification, called Android TV "Operator Tier", is available for pay television and other service operators allowing them to customize the home screen; manage UI as well as available apps, content or services on the Android TV devices that they provide to their subscribers; thus, differentiating from other operators and devices running Android TV as well.

By May 2022, Android TV has over 10,000 compatible apps available on the Play Store, up from the 6,500 available at launch.

== History ==
Android TV was first announced at Google I/O in June 2014, as a successor to the commercially unsuccessful Google TV. Some attendees received the platform's development kit, the ADT-1. The Information reported that the ADT-1 was based on a scrapped "Nexus TV" launch device that was being developed internally by Google. Google unveiled the first Android TV device, the Nexus Player developed by Asus, at a hardware event in October 2014.

The ADT-2 development kit device was released before the release of Android TV 9.0. Android TV 10 was released on December 10, 2019, together with the ADT-3 development kit. Android TV 11 was released for the ADT-3 on September 22, 2020, while rollouts were planned for original equipment manufacturer partners in subsequent months.

In September 2020, it was announced that Google TV experience that was designed to browse and discover content, will be available on televisions from Android TV OS partners starting in 2021. In February 2021, an update to Android TV home screen was announced which added three new tabs at the top: Home, Discover, Apps. The 'Discover' tab presents personalized recommendations for movies, shows and live TV.

Android TV 12 was released on November 30, 2021, with rollouts planned for late 2022. Android TV 13 was released on December 2, 2022 for developers using the ADT-3 development kit.

== Features ==
=== Content recommendations ===
Available since February 2021, the 'Discover' tab on updated home screen presents personalized recommendations for movies, shows and live TV.

Earlier, the Android TV home screen used a vertically scrolling, row-based interface, including a "content discovery" area populated by suggested content, followed by "Watch Now" rows that surfaced media content from installed apps.

=== Purchasing ===
Introduced in June 2023, the 'Shop' tab on Android TV home screen lets a signed-in user to explore movies to buy or rent and make purchases directly on the Android TV device. The tab also included 'Library' for accessing purchases made with same Google Account from YouTube, other Google TV and Android TV devices, and the Google TV mobile app.

=== Voice control ===
Android TV supports voice input commands allowing a user to search and discover content available through various apps and services as well as to control content playback using built-in Google Assistant. With Google assistant, users can also control their Smart Home devices.

=== Casting ===
Android TV supports casting via Google Cast from supported devices and apps.

=== Codecs ===
The Android TV usually includes proprietary audio codecs, such as Dolby Digital, Dolby Digital Plus, Dolby TrueHD, Dolby Atmos, DTS-HDMA and DTS:X. Also Android TV includes video codecs such as H.264, HEVC and AV1.

== Android TV hardware ==
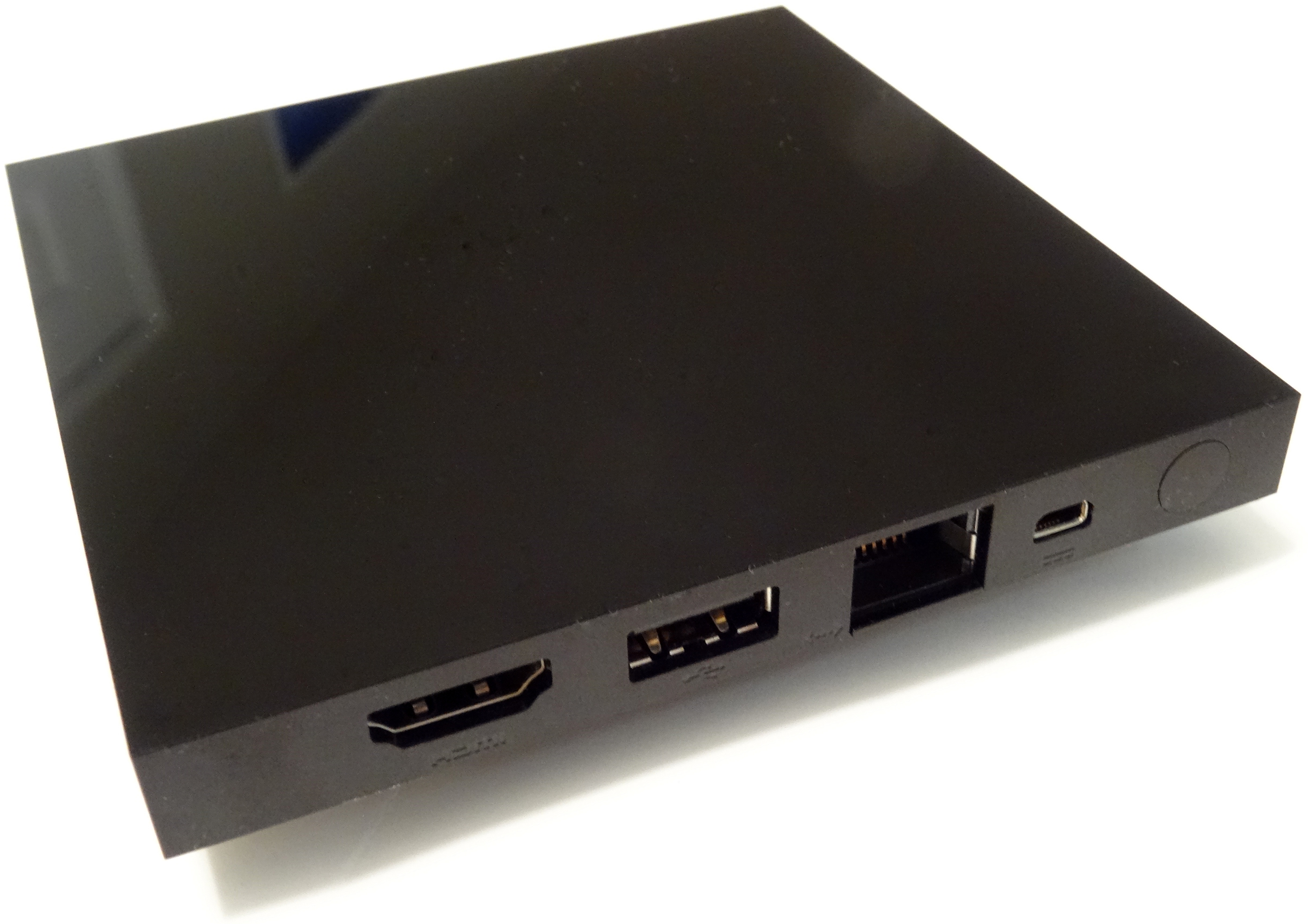
The ADT-1 digital media player, part of the official development kit for Android TV

Android TV has been used to power many types of devices, like smart TVs, smart projectors, set-top boxes and dongles. During Google I/O 2014, Google announced that Sony, Sharp, and TP Vision/Philips would release smart TVs with Android TV integrated in 2015. It was noted that support for handling TV-specific functions, such as input switching and tuning, were natively integrated into the Android platform.

Sony unveiled a range of Bravia smart TVs running Android TV at CES 2015. Sharp released two TV models on June 10, 2015. Philips announced that 80% of their 2015 TVs will run Android TV, the first two models of which were released in June 2015.

Google announced other television hardware partners in January 2016, including Arçelik, Bang & Olufsen, Haier, Hisense, RCA, TCL Corporation, Pensonic, Polytron, Vu Televisions, Onida, Vestel, OnePlus and Realme. SoC vendors for Android TV include MediaTek, Realtek and Rockchip.

Numerous commercial set-top boxes and dongles have been released using Android TV, most notably Google's Nexus Player, the Nvidia Shield TV, and Xiaomi's Mi Box, Mi Box S, and Mi TV Stick. Also, several pay television providers have released IPTV services using Android TV-based hardware as opposed to a proprietary set-top box.

In July 2019, Android TV became available on soundbars.

According to a report by TechCrunch in May 2023, several lines of budget-tier Android TV devices available for purchase from Amazon.com come preinstalled with malware.

=== SuperBox ===
In the United States, resellers sell Chinese-made Android TV IPTV set-top boxes under the brands SuperBox and vSeeBox. Instead of paying for monthly cable subscriptions or streaming subscriptions, buyers pay a one-time fee of US$300 to US$400 to purchase the streaming device. The boxes come pre-installed with software that makes it trivial to pirate live television, movies, pay-per-view content, and other shows.

==== SuperBox Controversy ====
The devices make home connections part of a criminal proxy network monetized for financial gain. Home users often have no idea or don't care that their connections are being used to facilitate crime, nation-state attacks, and additional malware delivery, enabling cybercriminals to infect already-compromised devices bypassing any router that the user may think offers protection.

== Google TV interface ==
Google TV

- Google TV's home screen interface
- Initial release: September 30, 2020; 6 years ago
Latest release
- Android: 4.39.4536 (Build 917279442.1) / May 22, 2026; 5 months ago
- iOS (Note: Including iPadOS): 3.33.1 / June 12, 2026; 4 months ago
- Marketing target: Smart TVs, digital media players, set-top boxes, USB dongles
- Available in: Multilingual
- Package manager: APK via Google Play
- Preceded by: Android TV
- Official website: tv.google

On September 30th, 2020, a new Android TV OS user interface, branded "Google TV", was introduced on a new Chromecast, coinciding with the rebranding of the Google Play Movies & TV mobile app to 'Google TV'.

Google TV as well as the new Android TV interface is integrated with the Google TV service. The default ordering of content titles, apps, services including recommendations, watchlist or purchased titles appearing on Google TV is set by Google based on app popularity, installed apps, user saved services, and contractual agreements with Google's partners. The Shop tab on Android TV allows a user to explore and buy or rent video titles distributed under Google TV service.

Starting with some set-top boxes, dongles, and smart TVs launched in 2021, Google TV replaced the Android TV interface on all new retail devices by the end of 2022. Devices launched with Android TV interface haven't been updated to Google TV but received a home screen redesign called the "Discover UI" with similar appearance to Google TV in February 2021. By the first week of September 2023, it was rolled out to more countries.

Google TV organizes live as well as on demand content titles from various services and installed apps into genres and topics including titles trending on Google Search. It was announced as "a new entertainment experience designed to help easily browse and discover what to watch". It features sponsored content and also offers an apps-only mode.

Google TV organizes available content from Google as well as various apps and services partners including app developers and film studios. As of December 2023, it supports 50 streaming services in the US and various regional services.

== See also ==
- List of smart TV platforms
