= Vu Televisions =

Indian multinational electronics company

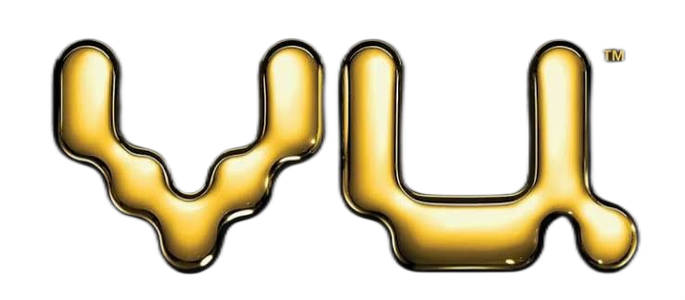
- Type: Privately held company
- Industry: Consumer electronics; Home appliance
- Founded: 2006; 20 years ago
- Founder: Devita Saraf
- Headquarters: Mumbai, India
- Area served: Worldwide
- Key people: Devita Saraf (CEO and Design Head)
- Products: Luxury Series; Premium UHD; Smart Series; Iconium Series; Play Series; Corporate TVs
- Brands: Vu
- Number of employees: 300
- Website: www.vutvs.com

Vu Televisions (also Vu Technologies) is an Indian electronics company that manufactures television brand and LED TV, and display manufacturer founded by Indian businessperson Devita Saraf, in Mumbai, India in 2006. It is among the top 10 largest-selling TV brand across e-commerce platforms in India.

== History ==
Vu Technologies was founded as a high-end electronics company in 2006 by Indian businessperson Devita Saraf, who became its CEO and Design Head.

The company turned profitable in 2012 and started exporting televisions to the United States. Vu introduced ultra-high-definition television (4K HD) in 2014.

Vu had annual sales of $30 million in 2015, with 300,000 units sold. Vu Technologies gave away a 25% stake in the company to private equity investors.

In 2016, Vu introduced entertainment-focused apps on its TVs, with video on demand including Netflix as a preloaded feature. The company had 20 stores in Indian cities. Its designer TV sets include one made in collaboration with designer Tarun Tahiliani, with a Swarovski crystal frame.

Vu Televisions are sold in 60 countries. In 2016, Flipkart became its exclusive online sales partner. The share of Vu grew to 40% of the total market share in the TV category for Flipkart.

Vu Technologies imports all the components for panel manufacturing from China, Taiwan, South Korea and Japan. The company had an annual turnover of ₹5 billion for 2016–17, and Flipkart reported that Vu had grown 200% on its marketplace in that period.
