= Intel Compute Stick =

Stick PC by Intel

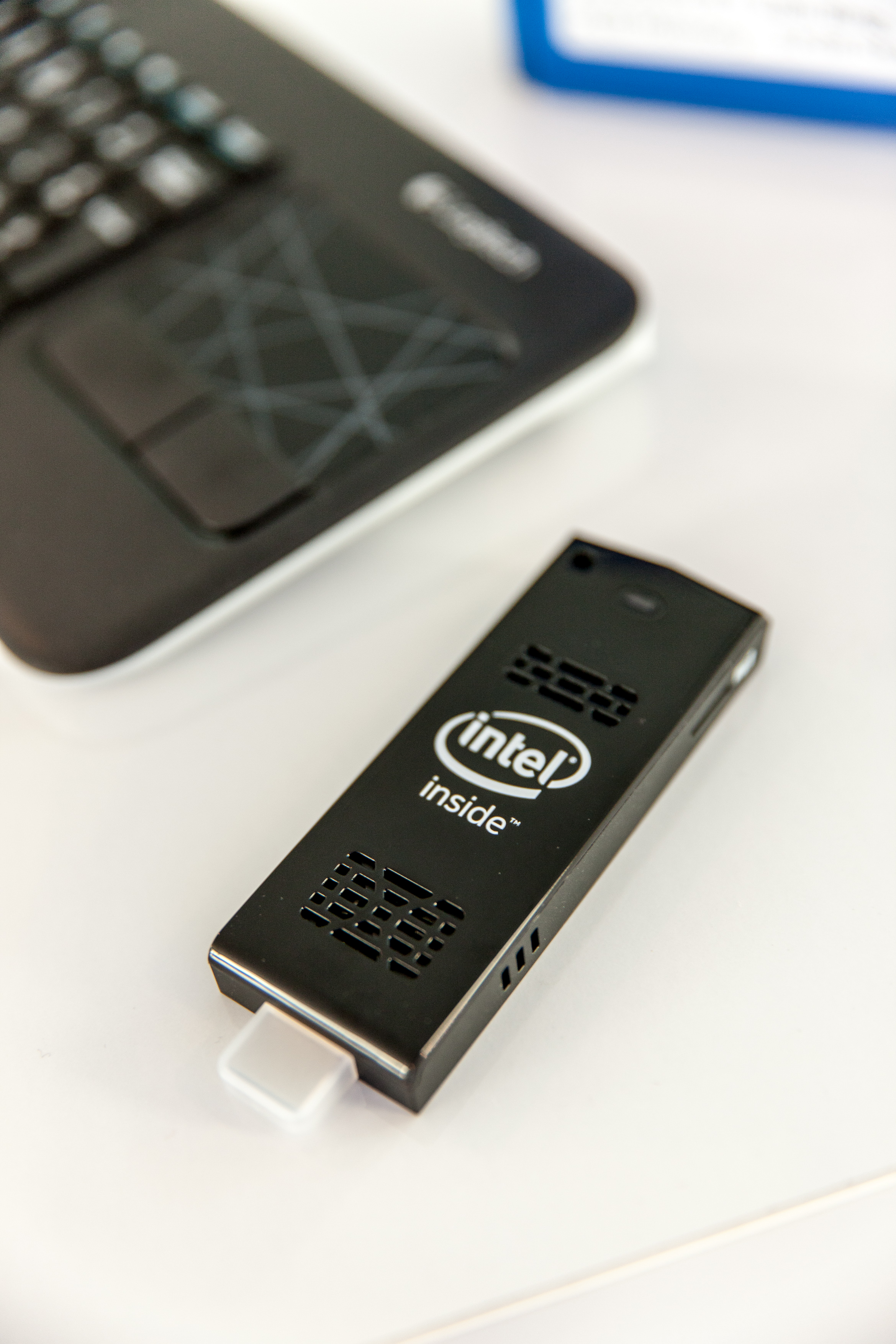
- Developer: Intel
- Manufacturer: Intel
- Type: Stick PC
- Released: April 24, 2015; 11 years ago (United States)
- Introductory price: $66.99 (Linux) to $395.00 (Windows 10)
- Discontinued: July 31, 2020
- Operating system: Windows 10, Windows 8.1, Linux
- System on a chip: Intel Core m5-6Y57, Intel Core m3-6Y30, Atom x5-Z8300, Atom Z3735F
- Memory: 1 GB to 4 GB
- Storage: 32 GB eMMC (Windows), 8 GB eMMC (Ubuntu), microSD (external)
- Display: Intel HD Graphics
- Sound: Intel HD Audio (via HDMI and Bluetooth)
- Connectivity: HDMI, Wi-Fi (802.11 b/g/n, 802.11 b/g/n/ac), USB 2.0/USB 2.0 & USB 3.0, Bluetooth 4.0/Bluetooth 4.2
- Power: micro-USB
- Dimensions: 103 mm × 37 mm × 12 mm (4.06 in × 1.46 in × 0.47 in)
- Website: Intel Compute Stick

The Intel Compute Stick is a discontinued stick PC designed by Intel to be used in media center applications. According to Intel, it is designed to be smaller than conventional desktop or other small-form-factor PCs, while offering comparable performance. Its main connector, an HDMI 1.4 port, along with a compatible monitor (or TV) and Bluetooth-based keyboards and mice, allows it to be used for general computing tasks.

The small form factor device was launched in early 2015 using the Atom Z3735F power-efficient processor from Intel's Bay Trail family, a SoC family that is predominantly designed for use with tablets and 2-in-1 devices. The processor offers 1.33 GHz processor base frequency and a maximum RAM of 2 GB. This is sufficient for home entertainment usage, light office productivity, thin clients, and digital signage applications.

In mid-2015 it was announced that second generation versions of the Compute Stick would feature advancements on the Bay Trail framework through application of Core M processors in the form factor. The new devices (released Q1 2016) allowed Intel to introduce additional processing power as well as 4 GB memory for "more intensive application and content creation" as well as "faster multi-tasking". The Intel Compute Stick line was discontinued on July 31, 2020.

== Versions ==
Number	Code Name	Shipped OS	System on a chip	Graphics	USB	# USB ports	RAM	Storage	TPM	Connectivity	First shipped
STCK1A32WFC^{a}	Falls City	Windows 8.1 with Bing	Intel® Atom™ Z3735F	Intel® HD Graphics	2.0	1	2 GB	32 GB eMMC; MicroSDXC slot	NA	802.11 b/g/n Bluetooth 4.0	2015 Q2
STCK1A32WFCR^{a}	Falls City	Windows 8.1 with Bing	Intel® Atom™ Z3735F	Intel® HD Graphics	2.0	1	2 GB	32 GB eMMC; MicroSDXC slot	NA	802.11 b/g/n Bluetooth 4.0	2015 Q2
STCK1A32WFCL^{a}	Falls City	Windows 10 with Bing	Intel® Atom™ Z3735F	Intel® HD Graphics	2.0	1	2 GB	32 GB eMMC; MicroSDXC slot	NA	802.11 b/g/n Bluetooth 4.0	2015 Q4
STCK1A8LFC	Falls City	Ubuntu 14.04	Intel® Atom™ Z3735F	Intel® HD Graphics	2.0	1	1 GB	8 GB eMMC; MicroSDXC slot	NA	802.11 b/g/n Bluetooth 4.0	2015 Q2
STK2MV64CC (CS525)	Cedar City	none	Intel® Core™ m5-6Y57	Intel® HD Graphics	3.0	3	4 GB	64 GB eMMC; MicroSDXC slot	2.0	802.11 b/g/n/ac Bluetooth 4.2	2016 Q1
STK2M364CC	Cedar City	none	Intel® Core™ m3-6Y30	Intel® HD Graphics	3.0	3	4 GB	64 GB eMMC; MicroSDXC slot	2.0	802.11 b/g/n/ac Bluetooth 4.2	2016 Q1
STK2M3W64CC (CS325)	Cedar City	Windows 10	Intel® Core™ m3-6Y30	Intel® HD Graphics	3.0	3	4 GB	64 GB eMMC; MicroSDXC slot	NA	802.11 b/g/n/ac Bluetooth 4.2	2016 Q1
STK1AW32SC (CS125)	Sterling City	Windows 10 with Bing	Intel® Atom™ x5-Z8330	Intel® HD Graphics	3.0+2.0	2	2 GB	32 GB eMMC; MicroSDXC slot	2.0	802.11 b/g/n/ac Bluetooth 4.2	2016 Q1
STK1A32SC	Sterling City	none	Intel® Atom™ x5-Z8330	Intel® HD Graphics	3.0+2.0	2	2 GB	32 GB eMMC; MicroSDXC slot	2.0	802.11 b/g/n/ac Bluetooth 4.2	2016 Q1

== Notes ==
1. Additionally, the three models of the STCK1A32WFC family differ in the list of countries issuing regulatory approval for their sale.
