= Alum (disambiguation) =

Alum is a type of chemical compound, and alum may refer to several related salts.

Alum may also refer to:

- Alum, Texas, a ghost town in the US
- Ålum, a settlement in the municipality of Randers, Denmark
- Robert Hallam or Alum (died 1417), English bishop and university chancellor

== See also ==
- Alumni, singular alumnus (masc), alumna (fem), former students or graduates of a school, college, or university
- Alum Bay, Isle of Wight, England
- Alum Creek (disambiguation)
- Alum Pot, a pothole in Simon Fell, North Yorkshire, England
- Alum Rock (disambiguation)
- Ålum Runestones, four Viking age runestones in Ålum, Denmark
- Alum Springs (disambiguation)
- Allum, a surname
- Allums, a surname
- Aluminium (disambiguation)
- Alumina, or aluminium oxide
