= Acer Googlebook 14 =

2026 laptop by Google

- Developer: Google and Acer Inc.
- Type: Laptops; Tablets
- Availability: October 4, 2026: United States; October 5, 2026: Canada; United Kingdom; Ireland; France; Germany; Australia
- Operating system: Googlebook OS
- System on a chip: Intel Core Ultra 5 325; Intel Core Ultra 7 355
- Memory: 16GB / 32GB
- Storage: 256 or 512 GB
- Sound: Stereo speakers
- Website: googlebook.google

The Acer Googlebook 14 is a laptop developed by Acer Inc. and Google that runs Googlebook OS. It is slated to be released in October 2026.

== History ==
Google first confirmed it was developing a successor to the Chromebook and Pixelbook Go, a lineup of mid to low-range laptop computers that run ChromeOS popular in U.S. K–12 education, in July 2025, when executive Sameer Samat told TechRadar that it was "combining ChromeOS and Android into a single platform", confirming months-long rumors and fulfilling decade-long wishes. He teased the new platform again in September, at Qualcomm's Snapdragon Summit event with Google hardware chief Rick Osterloh and Qualcomm CEO Cristiano Amon, saying that it would be launched in the following year.

In May 2026, at a livestreamed Google I/O pre-show entitled "The Android Show: I/O Edition", Google announced the Googlebook alongside Android 17, highlighting its deep integration with Gemini Intelligence—a slate of generative artificial intelligence (AI) features powered by Gemini—and revealing that the first devices in the product line would be available later that year. The company declined to share the name of the operating system that powers Googlebooks but clarified that "Aluminium OS" was a codename during development and would not be the actual name. Initial third-party original equipment manufacturer (OEM) partners included Acer, Asus, Dell, HP, and Lenovo; the Google Pixel team declined to comment on whether they would develop their own Googlebooks. Senior director Alexander Kuscher told Wired that Googlebooks would "sit at the more premium end of the laptop market", contrasting Chromebooks, which would continue to be supported post-launch.

Google officially revealed the product on May 21, 2026. Initial media lift and preorders began on September 21, 2026. It was then released in the United States on October 4, 2026, followed by Australia, Canada, France, Germany, Ireland and the United Kingdom the next day on October 5.

=== Release ===
On August 18, 2026, Google sent out invites for the next event, which was set for September 15 in New York City. On September 14, 2026, Google announced the pre-order date for the upcoming Googlebooks, set for September 21. A "Opening Night" event was announced for the first wave of Googlebooks, set for October 5.

The Acer Googlebook 14 was announced on September 21, along with the rest of the Googlebook lineup from Asus Dell, HP and Lenovo.

== Features ==
=== Hardware ===
The Acer Googlebook 14. It has an 14-inch WQXGA+ 3K (2880 x 1800) OLED display with a touchscreen and up to 500 nits peak brightness and Gorilla Glass. It uses a 71Wh battery. It supports Thunderbolt 4, USB-C, DisplayPort and USB Power Delivery.

=== Software ===
The Acer Googlebook 14 ships with a new operating system called Googlebook OS, an operating system based on Android and ChromeOS.

== See also ==
- ChromiumOS
- Fuchsia (operating system)
