= Aluminium (disambiguation) =

Aluminium (also aluminum in the US and Canada) is a chemical element with symbol Al and atomic number 13.

Aluminium or aluminum may also refer to:

- "Aluminum", a song from the 2001 album White Blood Cells, by The White Stripes
- "Aluminum", a song from the 2003 album Everything to Everyone, by the Barenaked Ladies
- Aluminum, a solo album by John Thomas Griffith
- "Aluminium", a song by Damon Albarn
- Aluminium OS a desktop OS from google based on Android
- Aluminium (album) a music and art project based upon the White Stripes' music; also an album released by that project
- Aluminium: The Thirteenth Element, an encyclopedia on the element
- Aluminum, an American automobile built by Aluminum Manufacturers, Inc. of Cleveland

== See also ==
- Isotopes of aluminium
- Transparent aluminum, a Star Trek fictional material
- Al (disambiguation)
