= Alum Springs =

Alum Springs may refer to:

- Alum Springs, Virginia, an unincorporated community in Pulaski County, Virginia
- Alum Springs, West Virginia, a ghost town in Greenbrier County, West Virginia
