= Alum Rock =

Alum Rock may refer to:

- Alum rock, a specific chemical compound and a class of chemical compounds
- Alum Rock (CDP), California, census-designated place in Santa Clara County
- Alum Rock, San Jose, a district of San Jose, California, located in East San Jose
- Alum Rock Park, in San Jose, California
- Alum Rock, Pennsylvania
- Alum Rock, Birmingham, an area in the UK, two miles east of Birmingham's city centre
  - Alum Rock (ward)
