= Chrome Zone =

Google retail stores

Coordinates: 51.5240°N 0.1372°W

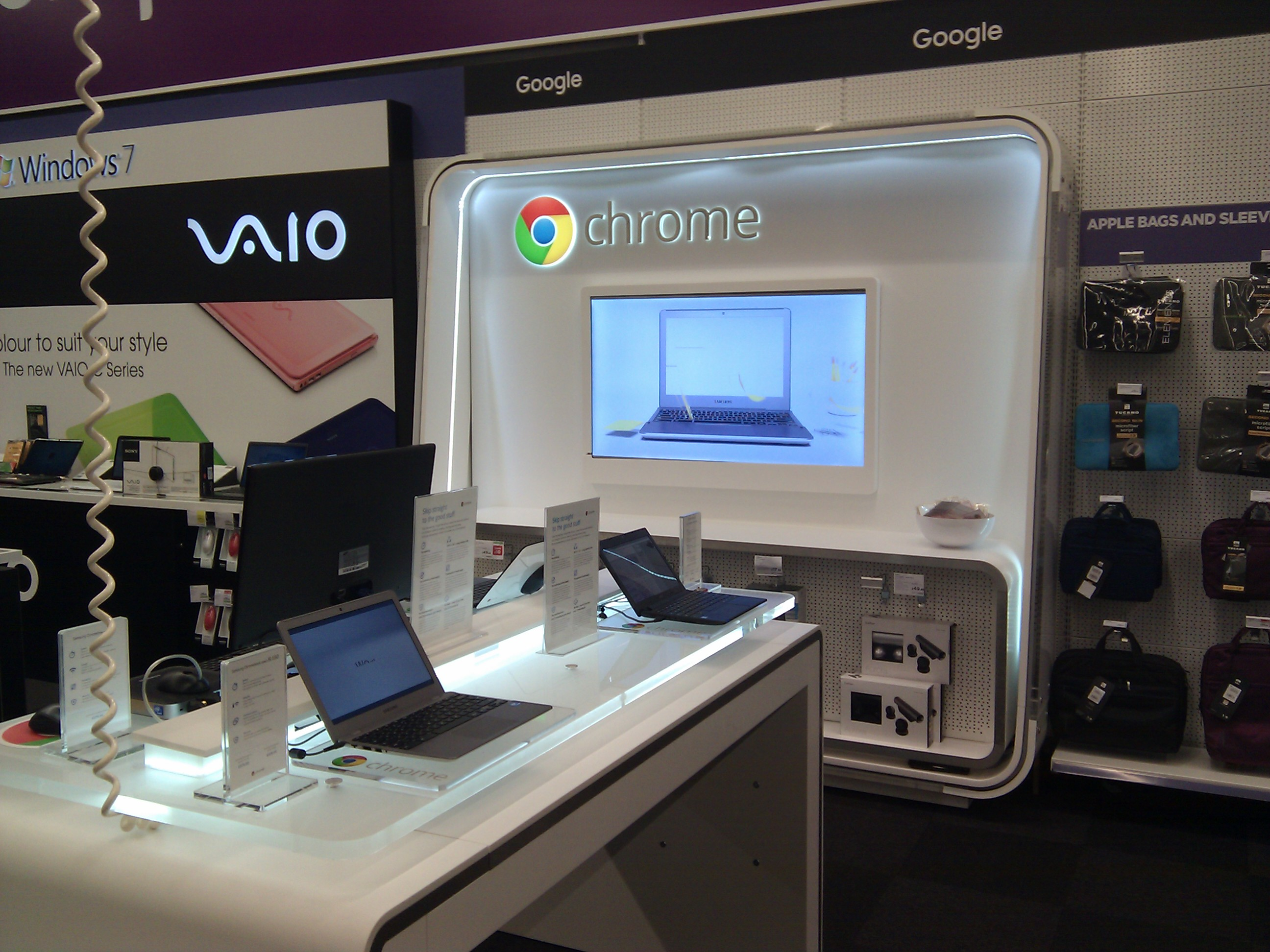
Chrome Zone store at PC World, New Malden

Chrome Zone was a chain of retail stores owned by Google. In its years of operation, only two branches were ever opened, one inside the PC World located on Tottenham Court Road in, London, England, opened in late September 2011, and another based in Essex, England which opened on October 7 of the same year.

Chrome Zone sold Chromebooks that ran the ChromeOS and accessories. In a statement released by the Google UK Head of Consumer Marketing Arvind Desikan in 2011, it was revealed that the London and Essex stores were only the first installments of "mini-shops" to be spread out internationally in the coming years. However, no further Chrome Zone locations were opened besides the two in England, and all Chrome Zone stores were eventually shut down.

== Features ==
The Chrome Zone's only products were Chromebooks, which are specially designed notebooks that run ChromeOS and are manufactured by Samsung and Acer, and accessories to go alongside the netbooks themselves.

The interiors of the Chrome Zone shops were brightly colored and modern, going along with Google's signature color palette. Stools, which guests sit on to try the Chromebooks, are a variety of colors and their middles are hollowed out. The computers themselves are situated on abstract-shaped tables, with a white underside and a blue upper layer, which can also hold the netbooks.
