= Allum =

Allum is an English surname. Notable people with this name include:

- Bill Allum (1916–1992), Canadian ice hockey player and coach
- Don Allum (1937–1992), English oarsman, the first person to row across the Atlantic Ocean in both directions
- James Allum, Canadian politician
- John Allum (1889–1972), New Zealand businessman and engineer, Mayor of Auckland City from 1941 to 1953
- Ron Allum (b. 1949), Australian submarine designer

== See also ==
- Allums
