= Allums =

Allums is a surname. Notable people with the surname include:

- Darrell Allums (born 1958), American basketball player
- Kye Allums (born 1989), American transgender advocate, public speaker, artist, mentor, and former basketball player

== See also ==
- Allum
