= Alum Springs, Virginia =

Unincorporated community in Virginia, US

Coordinates: 37°09′35″N 80°48′16″W

Alum Springs is an unincorporated community in Pulaski County, Virginia, United States.
