= Ron Allum =

Australian submarine designer, cave diver and inventor

- Born: 22 March 1949 (age 77); New South Wales, Australia
- Occupations: Submarine designer, cave diver, inventor
- Spouse: Yvette Allum
- Children: 2
- Website: www.ronallum.com

Ron Allum (born 22 March 1949) is an Australian submarine designer, cave diver and inventor.

Allum is regarded as one of the world's most experienced and accomplished cave divers. In 1983, he led an expedition to Cocklebiddy Cave of the Nullarbor Plain. The expedition achieved a world record push of 6.24 km (3.88 mi) into the cave system.

Allum collaborated with James Cameron on a project to make a live broadcast from the wreck of the Titanic in 2005. This involved designing and building a 6,000 m (20,000 ft) fiber-optic spool system link to the surface.

Allum designed the Deepsea Challenger submarine that took James Cameron to the Challenger Deep, the lowest point on Earth and the bottom of the Mariana Trench, 11 kilometres (6.8 mi) below sea level. This record-breaking exploration took place on 26 March 2012.

Allum was a national finalist for Senior Australian of the Year in 2013.

In 2019, Allum appeared in episode 17 of series 3 of the children's cartoon Go Jetters, playing himself. The episode featured exploration of the Mariana Trench using the Deepsea Challenger.

Ron Allum Deepsea Services has been sub-contracted by Cellula Robotics to implement a robust thruster and battery system for the SeaWolf Extra-Large Unmanned Underwater Vehicle (XLUUV).
