= Alum Rock, Pennsylvania =

Historic community in Pennsylvania, USA

Coordinates: 41°10′02″N 79°37′16″W

Alum Rock is an historic community located in Clarion County, Pennsylvania. It is located at 41.1672840 -79.6211593. Its post office operated until 1944.

== Sources ==
- U.S. Department of the Interior, U.S. Geological Survey, 1:62,500-scale topographic maps
- Foxburg Survey, 1944
- Alum Rock, Pennsylvania, Geographic Names Information System, U.S. Geological Survey.
