= Alum Springs, West Virginia =

- Ghost town
- Location within West Virginia
- Coordinates: 37°51′41″N 80°22′21″W
- Country: United States
- State: West Virginia
- County: Greenbrier
- Elevation: 2,333 ft (711 m)
- GNIS feature ID

Alum Springs is a ghost town in Greenbrier County, West Virginia, United States. Alum Springs was 2 miles (3.2 km) east of Maxwelton. Alum Springs appeared on USGS maps as late as 1923.
