= Aluminum Manufacturers =

Aluminum Manufacturers, Inc., based in Cleveland, Ohio, was a major producer of aluminum and brass materials in the early 20th century.

The company was incorporated in November 1919, absorbing The Aluminum Castings Company, a Detroit, Michigan company which had been incorporated in 1909. In 1922, this was "...one of the largest shops in Detroit for making aluminum and brass castings...." In 1920, it was noted that the company was controlled by the Aluminum Company of America (later known as Alcoa).

In 1921, the company was noted as an early adopter of medical design consulting in the construction of a manufacturing plant's industrial dispensary (an in-plant medical office).
