= Chromebook =

Laptop or tablet computer running ChromeOS

- Product type: Laptop
- Current owner: Google
- Produced by: c. 60 manufacturers, including Google
- Country: United States
- Introduced: 15 June 2011; 15 years ago
- Website: www.google.com/chromebook/

Chromebook (stylized in all-lowercase) is a line of laptop computers that run ChromeOS and Googlebook OS, two proprietary operating systems developed by Google.

Chromebooks are optimised for web access. They also run Android apps, Linux applications, and progressive web apps which do not require an Internet connection. They are manufactured and offered by various OEMs.

The first Chromebooks were shipped on June 15, 2011. As of 2020, Chromebook's market share is 10.8%, placing it above the Mac platform; it has mainly found success in education markets.

Since 2021, all Chromebooks receive 10 years of regular automatic updates with security patches from Google; previously, Chromebooks received 8 years of updates. Chromebooks can be repurposed with other operating systems and/or used for other purposes if required.

== History ==
The first Chromebooks for sale, by Acer Inc. and Samsung, were announced at the Google I/O conference on May 11, 2011 and began shipping on June 15, 2011. Lenovo, Hewlett-Packard (now HP Inc.) and Google itself entered the market in early 2013. In December 2013, Samsung launched a Samsung Chromebook specifically for the Indian market that employed the company's Exynos 5 Dual core processor.

Critical reaction to the device was initially skeptical, with some reviewers, such as then New York Times technology columnist David Pogue, unfavorably comparing the value proposition of Chromebooks with that of more fully featured laptops running the Microsoft Windows operating system. That complaint dissipated later in reviews of machines from Acer and Samsung that were priced lower.

In February 2013, Google announced and began shipping the Chromebook Pixel, a higher-spec machine with a high-end retail price.

In January 2015, Acer announced the first big screen Chromebook, the Acer Chromebook 15 with an FHD 15.6-inch display.

By March 2018, Chromebooks made up 60% of computers purchased by schools in the United States. In October 2012, Simon Phipps, writing in InfoWorld, said, "The Chromebook line is probably the most successful Linux desktop/laptop computer we've seen to date".

On October 9, 2023, Google announced Chromebook Plus, a new category of Chromebooks that requires minimum hardware specifications, such as CPU (Intel Core i3 12th Gen or the AMD Ryzen 3 7000 series), at least 8 GB of RAM, 128 GB of local storage, 1080p IPS or better display and a 1080p+ web camera. The Plus supports video-editing with LumaFusion and web versions of Google Photos Magic Eraser and Adobe Photoshop.

On May 12, 2026, the successor to the Chromebook, the Googlebook was announced, with a focus on integrating AI features and switching from ChromeOS to a desktop Android operating system known as Aluminium OS. The Chromebook is not being discontinued and existing Chromebooks will continue to receive software updates for up to 10 years.

=== Integration with Android ===
In May 2016, Google announced it would make Android apps available on Chromebooks via the Google Play application distribution platform. At the time, Google Play access was scheduled for the ASUS Chromebook Flip, the Acer Chromebook R 11 and the most recent Chromebook Pixel, with other Chromebooks slated over time. Partnering with Google, Samsung released the Chromebook Plus and Chromebook Pro in early 2017, the first Chromebooks to come with the Play Store pre-installed. A February 2017 review in The Verge reported that the Plus with its ARM processor handled Android apps "much better" than the Intel-based Pro, but said that "Android apps on Chrome OS are still in beta" and are "very much [an] unfinished experience." The number of ChromeOS systems supporting Android apps in either the stable or beta channel is increasing.

In the 2021 Android 11 launch, it was announced that Android apps would be moved to a new virtual machine called ArcVM, to improve Android’s environment isolation for better security and maintainability.

=== Compatibility with Linux applications (GNU compatibility) ===
In May 2018, Google announced it would make Linux desktop applications available on Chromebooks via a virtual machine code-named "Crostini". ChromeOS, which runs on Chromebooks, is already based on the Linux kernel, but it does not provide default support for applications that expect a GNU-based system. Crostini left the beta stage in May 2021 as part of release 91. Google maintains a list of devices that were launched before 2019, which support Crostini.

== Design ==
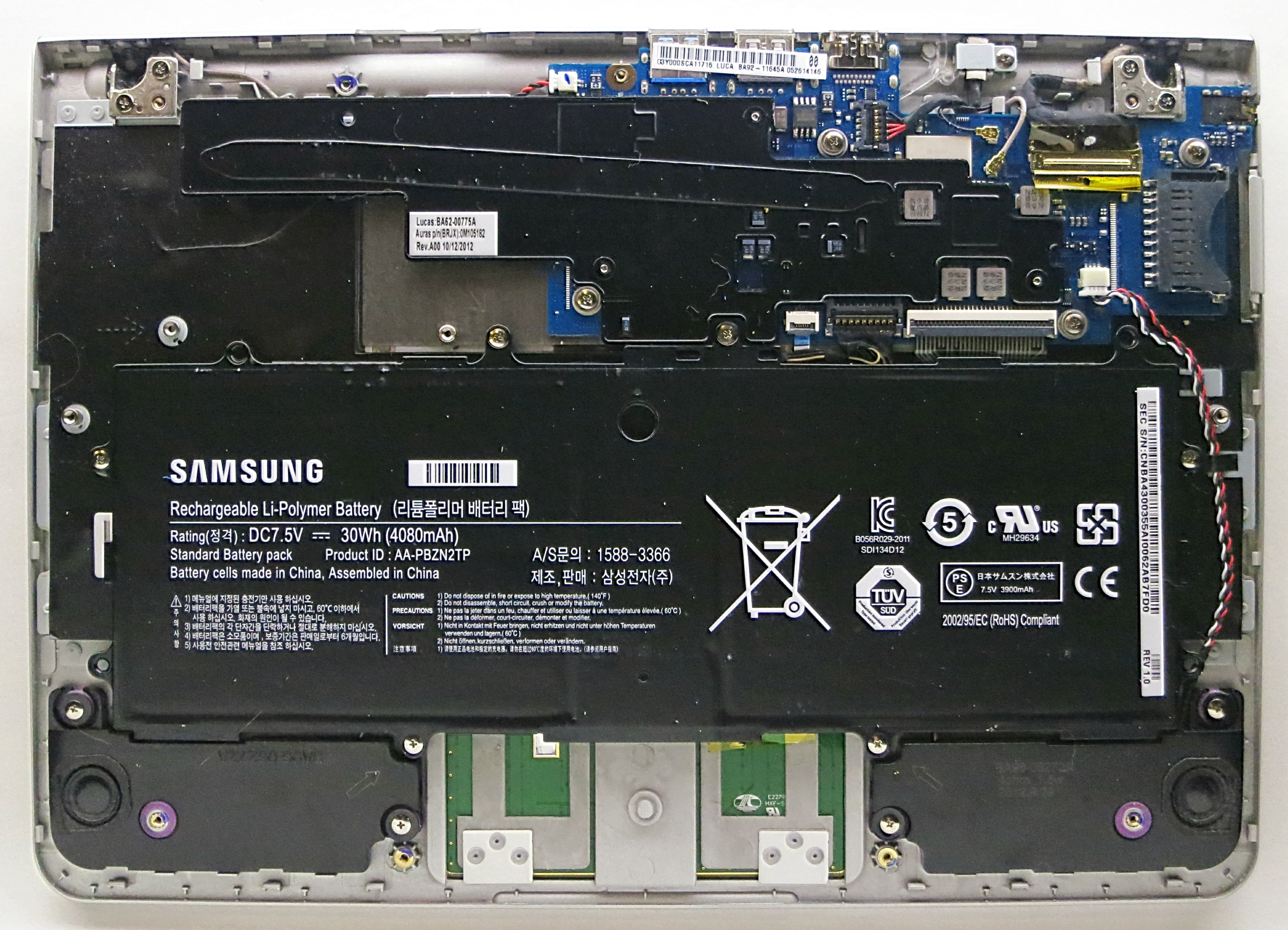
Samsung Chromebook Series 3 with bottom panel removed

Initial hardware partners for Chromebook development included Acer, Adobe, Asus, Freescale, Hewlett-Packard (later HP Inc.), Lenovo, Qualcomm, Texas Instruments, Toshiba, Intel, Samsung, Dell, LG, NEC, and Sharp; the latter three manufacturers were only available in their home countries.

Chromebooks ship with ChromeOS, an operating system that uses the Linux kernel and the Google Chrome web browser with an integrated media-player. Enabling developer mode allows the installation of Linux distributions and other operating systems on Chromebooks. Chromebooks also include a screw or switch directly on the motherboard to enable or disable write protection, while later models require the battery to be removed. Crouton is a script that allows the installation of Linux distributions from ChromeOS and running both operating systems simultaneously. Some Chromebooks include SeaBIOS, which can be enabled to install and boot Linux distributions directly. With limited offline capability and a fast boot time, Chromebooks are primarily designed for use while connected to the Internet and signed in to a Google account. Instead of installing traditional applications that propose risk of malware, users install web apps from the Chrome Web Store. Google claims that a multi-layer security architecture eliminates the need for anti-virus software.

Support for many Bluetooth and USB devices such as cameras, mice, external keyboards and flash drives is included, utilizing a feature similar to plug-and-play on other operating systems.

All Chromebooks, except the first three, boot with the help of Coreboot, a fast-booting BIOS.

Google supports new Chromebooks made since 2021 with automatic updates for at least 10 years. Previously, Chromebooks were supported 8 years, while they were initially supported for 6.5 years. The date when a device will stop receiving automatic software and security updates can be found in the "Additional info" section of the "About device" in the device settings. Google maintains an Auto Update policy listing ChromeOS makes and models with their auto update expiration dates.

The hardware generation and Linux kernel version of most products can be inferred from the code name and its corresponding video game series:

Architecture	Game series	Characters
Bay Trail	Donkey Kong	Rambi, Swanky, Quawks,...
Haswell	Star Fox	Slippy, Falco, Peppy,...
Broadwell	Final Fantasy X	Auron, Paine, Yuna, Rikku,...

=== Form factors ===
Chromebooks are available from OEMs in various form factors (some form factors may be known by other names):

- Chromebook in laptop form factor.
- Chromebook tablet, introduced in March 2018 by Acer, the Chromebook Tab 10. The device was to compete with the lower-priced Apple iPad tablet in the education market.
- Chromebox, an ultra small form-factor desktop PC first introduced by Samsung in May 2012.
- Chromebase, an all-in-one desktop PC was introduced by LG Electronics in January 2014.
- Chromebit, an HDMI stick PC introduced by Asus in April 2015. However, as of 2019, OEMs do not currently manufacture this form factor.

== Sales and marketing ==
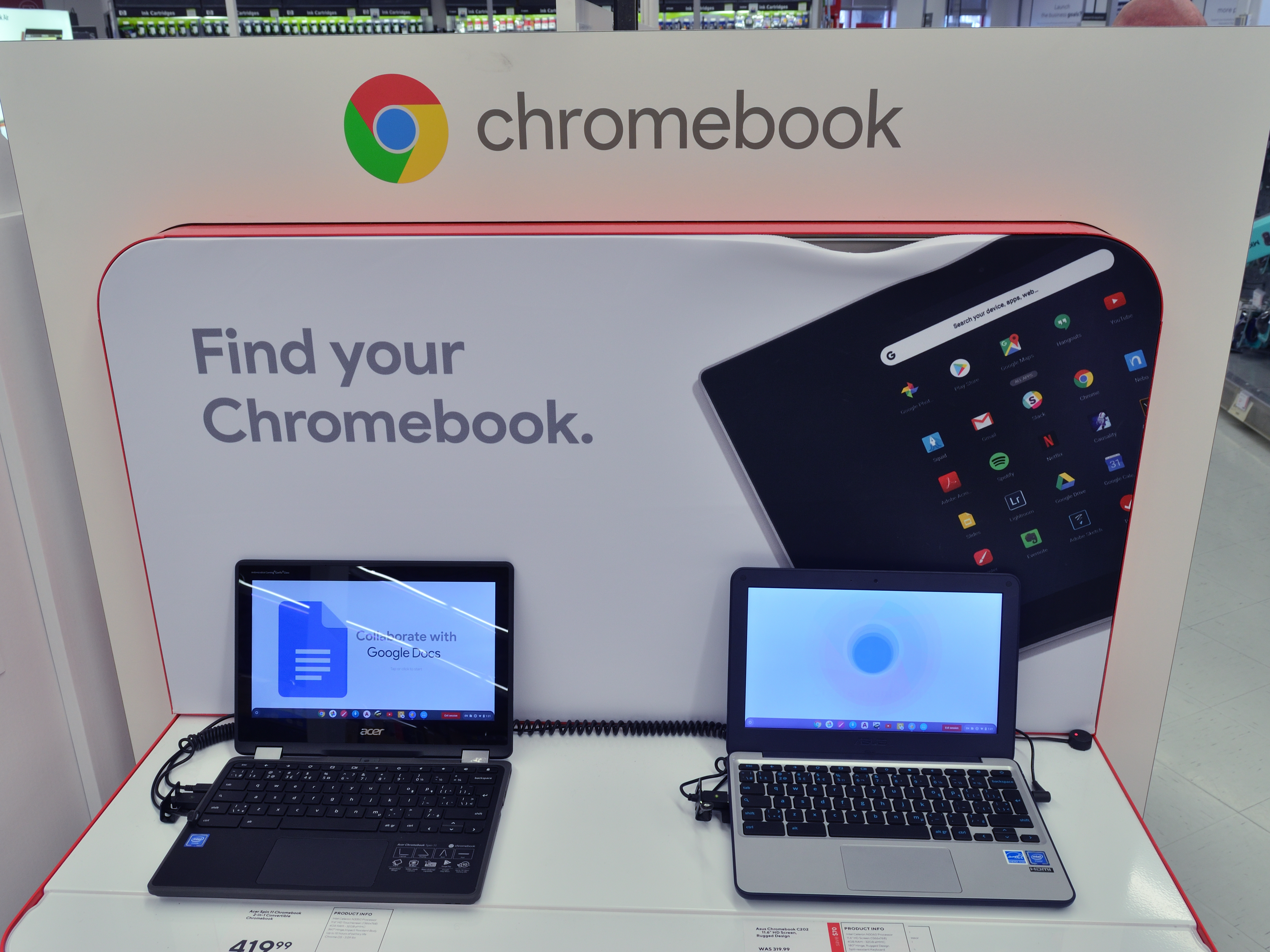
Chromebooks at a Staples retail store

The first two commercially available Chromebooks, the Samsung Series 5 and the Acer AC700, were unveiled on May 11, 2011, at the Google I/O developer conference. They were to begin selling through online channels, including Amazon and Best Buy in the United States, the United Kingdom, France, Germany, the Netherlands, Italy and Spain starting June 15, 2011; however, Acer's AC700 was not available until early July. The first machines sold for between $349 and $499, depending on the model and 3G option. Google also offered a monthly payment scheme for business and education customers at $28 and $20 per user, per month, respectively for a three-year contract, including replacements and upgrades. Verizon offers models equipped with 3G/4G LTE connectivity 100–200 MB of free wireless data per month, for two years.

Google's early marketing efforts relied primarily on hands-on experience: giving away Samsung machines to 10 Cr-48 pilot program participants along with the title Chromebook Guru and lending Chromebooks to passengers on some Virgin America flights.

At the end of September 2011, Google launched the Chrome Zone, a "store within a store", inside the Currys and PC World superstore in London. The store had a Google-style look and feel with splashes of color all around the retail store front. The concept was later changed to a broader in-store Google shop, which has not expanded beyond the PC World on Tottenham Court Road.

In addition to these marketing strategies, Google Chrome has created several "Chromebook minis" that demonstrate the ease of use and simplicity of the devices in a comical manner. For example, when the question "How do you back up a Chromebook" is asked, it is implied to refer to data backup, but instead, shows two hands pushing a Chromebook back to the end of a table. This is followed by the statement, "You don't have to back up a Chromebook," showing how all data is stored on the web.

In an article published on ZDNet in June 2011, entitled "Five Chromebook concerns for businesses", Steven J. Vaughan-Nichols faulted the devices for lack of virtual private network capability, not supporting some Wi-Fi security methods, in particular Wi-Fi Protected Access II (WPA2) Enterprise with Extensible Authentication Protocol-Transport Layer Security (EAP-TLS) or Cisco's Lightweight Extensible Authentication Protocol (LEAP). He also noted that its file manager does not work, the need to use the undocumented crosh shell to accomplish basic tasks such as setting up a secure shell (SSH) network connection as well as serious deficiencies in documentation.

In one of the first customer reviews, the city of Orlando, Florida, reported on their initial testing of 600 Chromebooks as part of a broader study related to accessing virtual desktops. Early indications show potential value in reducing IT support costs. End users have indicated that the Chromebook is easy to travel with and starts up quickly. One stated that "If I just need to stay connected for emergencies, I take my Chrome," but when traveling for business she would still take her laptop. Orlando does plan to continue to use the Chromebooks.

On November 21, 2011, Google announced price reductions on all Chromebooks. Since then, the Wi-Fi-only Samsung Series 5 was reduced to $349, the 3G Samsung Series 5 was reduced to $449, and the Acer AC700 was reduced to $299.

The updated Series 5 550 and the Chromebox, the first ChromeOS desktop machines, were released by Samsung in May 2012. While the two lowest cost Chromebooks emerged later in the fall: the $249 Samsung Series 3 and the $199 Acer C7. The following February, Google introduced the most expensive machine, their Chromebook Pixel, with a starting price of $1299. All models released after May 2012, include 100 GB–1.09 TB of Google Drive cloud storage and 12 GoGo Wi-Fi passes.

By January 2013, Acer's Chromebook sales were being driven by "heavy Internet users with educational institutions", and the platform represented 5–10 percent of the company's US shipments, according to Acer president Jim Wong. He called those numbers sustainable, contrasting them with low Windows 8 sales which he blamed for a slump in the market. Wong said that the company would consider marketing Chromebooks to other developed countries, as well as to corporations. He noted that although ChromeOS is free to license for hardware vendors, it has required greater marketing expenditure than Windows, offsetting the licensing savings.

During the first 11 months of 2013, 1.76 million Chromebooks sold in the United States, representing 21% of the US commercial business-to-business laptop market. During the same period in 2012, Chromebooks sold 400,000 units and had a negligible market share.

In January 2015, Silviu Stahie noted in Softpedia that Chromebooks were eating into Microsoft's market share. He said "Microsoft is engaged in a silent war and it's actually losing. They are fighting an enemy that is so insidious and so cunning that it's actually hurting the company more than anything else. The enemy is called Chromebooks and they are using Linux...There is no sign that things are slowing down and Microsoft really needs a win, and soon if it wants to remain relevant."

In 2015, Chromebooks, by sales volume (to companies in the US), are second after Windows based devices (with Android tablets, overtaking Apple's devices in 2014): "Chromebook sales through the U.S. B2B channels increased 43 percent during the first half of 2015, helping to keep overall B2B PC and tablet sales from falling. [..] Sales of Google OS-equipped (Android and Chrome) devices saw a 29 percent increase over 2014 propelled by Chromebook sales, while Apple devices declined 12 percent and Windows devices fell 8 percent."

As of October 28, 2024 Lenovo Chromebook N23 Intel Celeron is the cheapest Chromebook in the world.

In 2020, Chromebooks outsold Apple Macs for the first time by taking market share from laptops running Microsoft Windows. This rise is attributed to the platform's success in the education market.

=== Education market ===
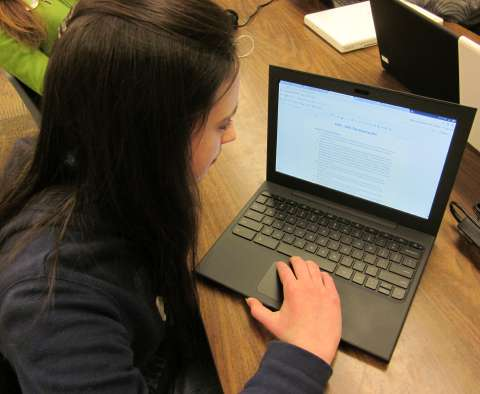
A Paradise Valley Unified School District student using a Chromebook as part of the organization's pilot project

The education market has been the Chromebooks' most notable success, competing on the low cost of the hardware, software and upkeep. The simplicity of the machines, which could be a drawback in other markets, has proven an advantage to school districts by reducing training and maintenance costs.

By January 2012, even while commercial sales were flat, Google placed nearly 27,000 Chromebooks in schools across 41 states in the US, including "one-on-one" programs, which allocate a computer for every student in South Carolina, Illinois, and Iowa. As of August 2012, over 500 school districts in the United States and Europe were using the device. In 2016, Chromebooks represented 58 percent of the 2.6 million mobile devices purchased by U.S. schools and about 64 percent of that market outside the U.S. By contrast, sales of Apple devices to U.S. schools dropped that year to 19 percent, compared with 52 percent in 2012.

Helping spur Chromebook sales is Google Classroom, an app designed for teachers in 2014, that serves as a hub for classroom activities including attendance, classroom discussions, homework and communication with students and parents.

There have, however, been concerns about privacy within the context of the education market for Chromebooks. Officials at schools issuing Chromebooks for students have affirmed that students have no right to privacy when using school-issued Chromebooks, even at home, and that all online and offline activity can be monitored by the school using third-party software, such as GoGuardian, pre-installed on the laptops. Further, the Electronic Frontier Foundation has complained that Google itself is violating the privacy of students by enabling the synchronization function within Google Chrome ("Chrome Sync") by default, allowing web browsing histories and other data of students – including those under-13 – to be stored on Google servers and potentially used for purposes other than authorized educational purposes. A point of contention has been the fact that users of school-issued Chromebooks cannot change these settings themselves as a measure to protect their privacy; only the administrator who issued the laptops can change them. The EFF claims that this violates a Student Privacy Pledge already signed by Google in 2014. EFF staff attorney Nate Cardozo stated: "Minors shouldn't be tracked or used as guinea pigs, with their data treated as a profit center. If Google wants to use students' data to 'improve Google products', then it needs to get express consent from parents."

Despite this, Chromebooks made up nearly 60% of computers used in US schools in March 2018. CNET writer Alfred Ng cited superior security as the main reason for this level of market adoption.

According to research firms Gartner and Canalys, over 30 million Chromebooks were shipped in 2020, as school districts and parents purchased them for remote learning purposes during the COVID-19 pandemic.

== Manufacturers and model examples ==
Chromebooks made by 10 manufacturers are sold as of June 10, 2025.

- Acer Inc.
- Asus
- Dell
- Fujitsu Client Computing Limited: Only sold in Japan
- HP Inc.
- Lenovo
- LG Electronics: Only sold in South Korea
- NEC: Only sold in Japan
- Samsung Electronics
- Sharp Corporation: Only sold in Japan

Further, there are four manufacturers that ended making Chromebooks before 2022.

- AOpen
- Haier
- Hisense
- Toshiba

=== Google ===
==== Cr-48 ====
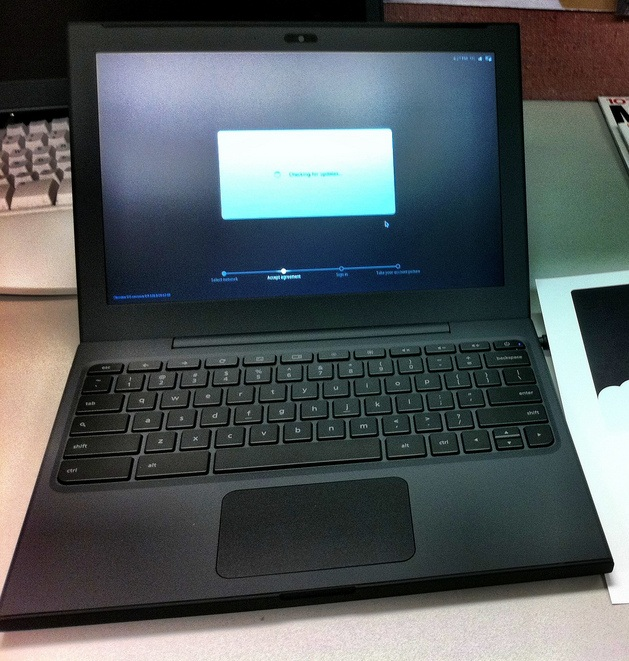
Cr-48

At a December 7, 2010, press briefing, Google announced the ChromeOS Pilot Program, a pilot experiment and the first Chromebook, the Cr-48 Chrome Notebook, a prototype, to test the ChromeOS operating system and modified hardware for it. The device had a minimal design and was all black, completely unbranded although it was made by Inventec, and had a rubberized coating. The device was named after Chromium-48, an unstable isotope of the metallic element Chromium (chemical symbol Cr), and the participants were named Cr-48 Test Pilots and the internal name for the device was Mario. Google distributed about 60,000 Cr-48 Chrome Notebooks between December 2010 and March 2011 for free to participants and in return asked for feedback such as suggestions and bug reports. The Cr-48 was intended for testing only, not retail sales.

The Cr-48's hardware design broke convention by replacing certain keys with shortcut keys, such as the function keys, and replacing the caps lock key with a dedicated search key (now called the "Everything Button"), which can be changed back to caps lock in the OS's keyboard settings. Google addressed complaints that the operating system offers little functionality when the host device is not connected to the Internet, demonstrated an offline version of Google Docs, and announced a 3G plan that would give users 100 MB of free data each month, with additional paid plans available from Verizon.

The device's USB port is capable of supporting a keyboard, mouse, Ethernet adapter, or USB storage, but not a printer, as ChromeOS offers no print stack. Adding further hardware outside of the previously mentioned items will likely cause problems with the operating system's "self knowing" security model. Users instead were encouraged to use a secure service called Google Cloud Print to print to legacy printers connected to their desktop computers, or to connect an HP ePrint, Kodak Hero, Kodak ESP, or Epson Connect printer to the Google Cloud Print service for a "cloud aware" printer connection.

The Cr-48 prototype laptop gave reviewers their first opportunity to evaluate ChromeOS running on a device. Ryan Paul of Ars Technica wrote that the machine "met the basic requirements for Web surfing, gaming, and personal productivity, but falls short for more intensive tasks." He praised Google's approach to security but wondered whether mainstream computer users would accept an operating system whose only application is a browser. He thought ChromeOS "could appeal to some niche audiences": people who just need a browser or companies that rely on Google Apps and other Web applications. But the operating system was "decidedly not a full-fledged alternative to the general purpose computing environments that currently ship on netbooks." Paul wrote that most of ChromeOS's advantages "can be found in other software environments without having to sacrifice native applications."

In reviewing the Cr-48 on December 29, 2010, Kurt Bakke of Conceivably Tech wrote that a Chromebook had become the most frequently used family appliance in his household. "Its 15 second startup time and dedicated Google user accounts made it the go-to device for quick searches, email as well as YouTube and Facebook activities." But the device did not replace other five notebooks in the house: one for gaming, two for the kids, and two more for general use. "The biggest complaint I heard was its lack of performance in Flash applications."

In ongoing testing, Wolfgang Gruener, also writing in Conceivably Tech, said that cloud computing at cellular data speeds is unacceptable and that the lack of offline ability turns the Cr-48 "into a useless brick" when not connected. "It's difficult to use the Chromebook as an everyday device and give up what you are used to on a Mac/Windows PC, while you surely enjoy the dedicated cloud computing capabilities occasionally."

The Cr-48 features an Intel Atom N455, a single-core processor clocked at 1.66 GHz, with 512 KB of cache and hyperthreading enabled. It also features 2 GB of removable DDR3 memory in a single SO-DIMM, integrated chipset graphics (Intel GMA 3150), and a 66 watt-hour battery. It has been found that the Intel NM10 chipset can get very hot during operation due to lack of a proper heatsink, but this has been fixed in production Chromebooks.

==== Pixel ====
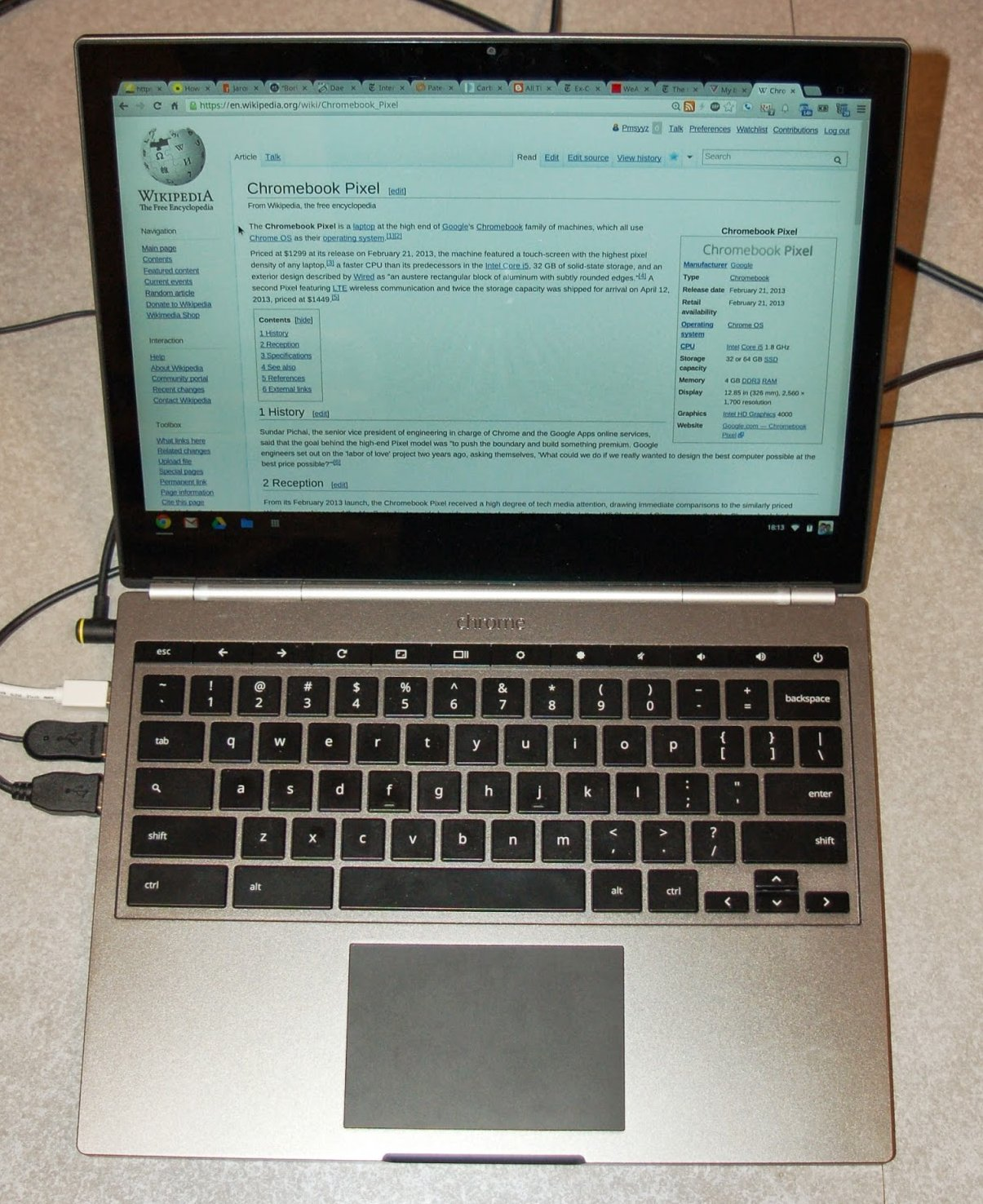
Chromebook Pixel (WiFi)

Launched by Google in February 2013, the Chromebook Pixel was the high-end machine in the Chromebook family. The laptop has an unusual 3:2 display aspect ratio touch screen featuring what was at its debut the highest pixel density of any laptop, a faster CPU than its predecessors in the Intel Core i5, and an exterior design described by Wired as "an austere rectangular block of aluminum with subtly rounded edges". A second Pixel featuring LTE wireless communication and twice the storage capacity was shipped for arrival on April 12, 2013.

The machine received much media attention, with many reviewers questioning the Pixel's value proposition compared to similarly priced Windows machines and the MacBook Air.

==== Pixelbook ====
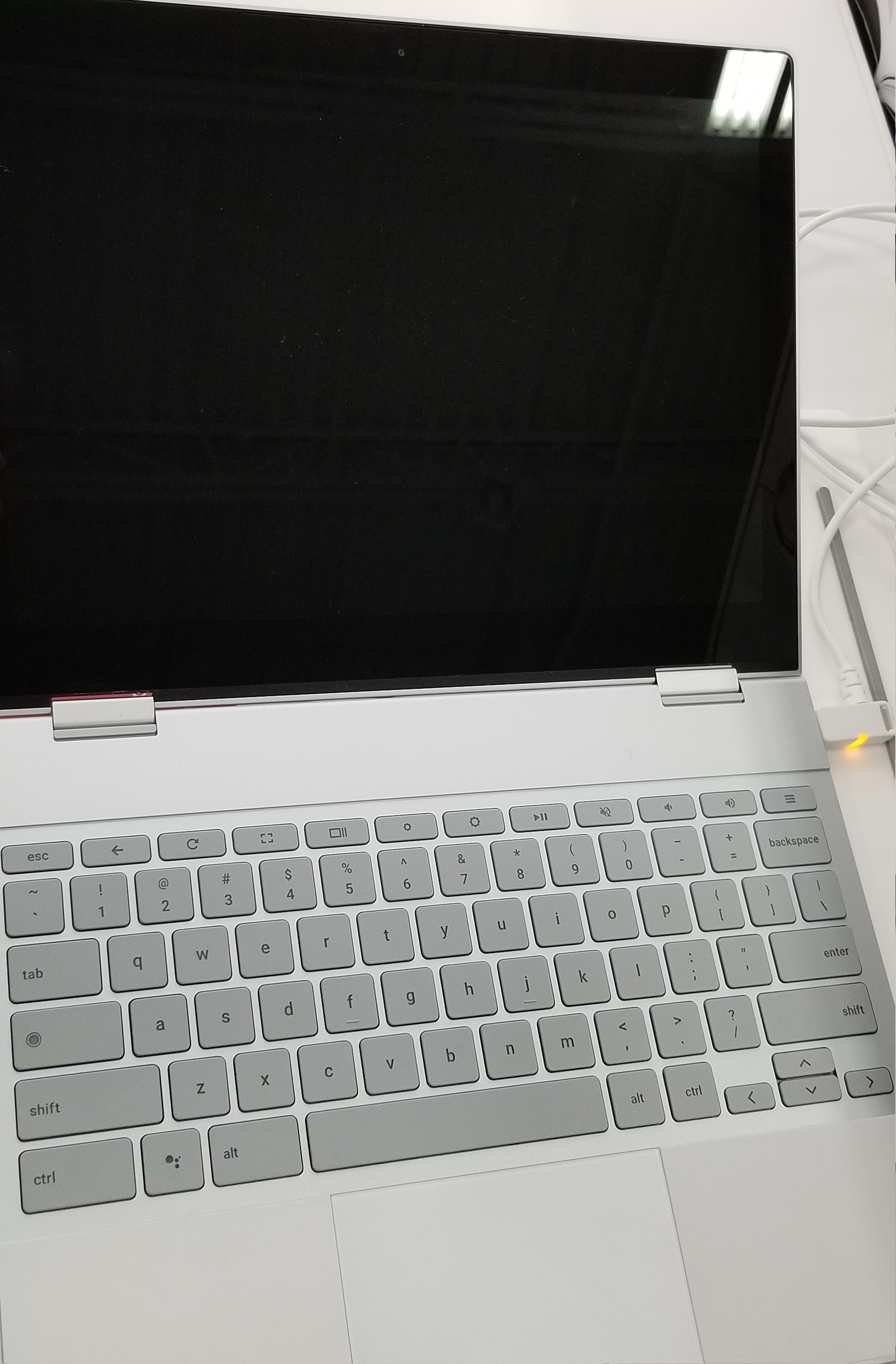
Pixelbook

In 2017, Google launched the Pixelbook to replace the Chromebook Pixel. Like the Chromebook Pixel, the Pixelbook has a 3:2 aspect ratio touchscreen with a high pixel density 12.3" display. Unlike the original Chromebook Pixel but like the second generation, the Pixelbook excludes an option for LTE. Instead, it implements Google's "instant tethering", which automatically tethers a Pixelbook to a Pixel phone's mobile connection.

==== Pixelbook Go ====
Announced in October 2019, The Pixelbook Go was released as a budget version of the Pixelbook, notable for its comparatively low price of $649 and light weight of 2.1 pounds. A version with a 4K display and Intel Core i7 processor followed in December.

=== Samsung ===
==== Samsung Series 5 ====
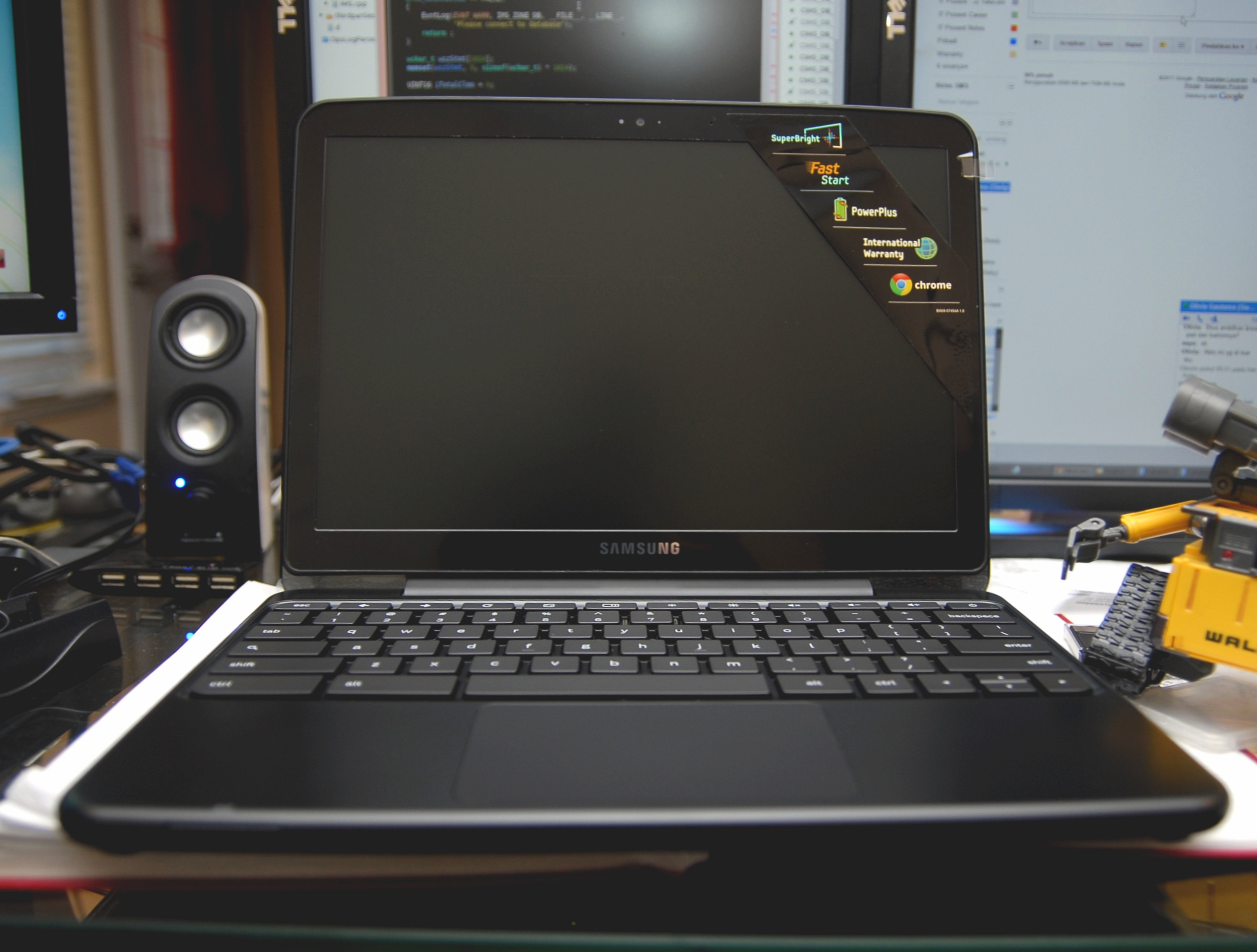
Samsung Series 5

Reviewing the Samsung Series 5 specifications, Scott Stein of CNET was unimpressed with a machine with a 12-inch screen and just 16 GB of onboard storage. "Chrome OS might be lighter than Windows XP, but we'd still prefer more media storage space. At this price, you could also get an 11.6-inch (290 mm) Wi-Fi AMD E-350-powered ultraportable running Windows 7." On the other hand, MG Siegler of TechCrunch wrote a largely favorable review, praising the improvements in speed and touchpad sensitivity over the CR-48 prototype, as well as the long battery life and the fact that all models are priced below the iPad.

In June 2011, iFixit dismantled a Samsung Series 5 and concluded that it was essentially an improved Cr-48. They rated it as 6/10 for repairability, predominantly because the case has to be opened to change the battery and because the RAM chip is soldered to the motherboard. iFixit noted that the "mostly-plastic construction" felt "a little cheap". On the plus side they stated that the screen was easy to remove and most of the components, including the solid-state drive, would be easy to replace. iFixit's Kyle Wiens wrote that the Series 5 "fixes the major shortfalls of the Cr-48 and adds the polish necessary to strike lust into the heart of a broad consumer base: sleek looks, 8+ hours of battery life, and optimized performance."

==== Samsung Series 5 550 ====
In May 2012, Samsung introduced the Chromebook Series 5 550, with a Wi-Fi model and more expensive 3G model.

Reviews generally questioned the value proposition. Dana Wollman of Engadget wrote that the Chromebook's keyboard "put thousand-dollar Ultrabooks to shame" and offered better display quality than on many laptops selling for twice as much. But the price "seems to exist in a vacuum—a place where tablet apps aren't growing more sophisticated, where Transformer-like Win8 tablets aren't on the way and where there aren't some solid budget Windows machines to choose from."

Joe Wilcox of BetaNews wrote that "price to performance and how it compares to other choices" is "where Chromebook crumbles for many potential buyers." He noted that the new models sell for more than their predecessors, and while the price-performance ratio is quite favorable compared to the MacBook Air, "by the specs, there are plenty of lower-cost options."

==== Samsung Series 3 ====
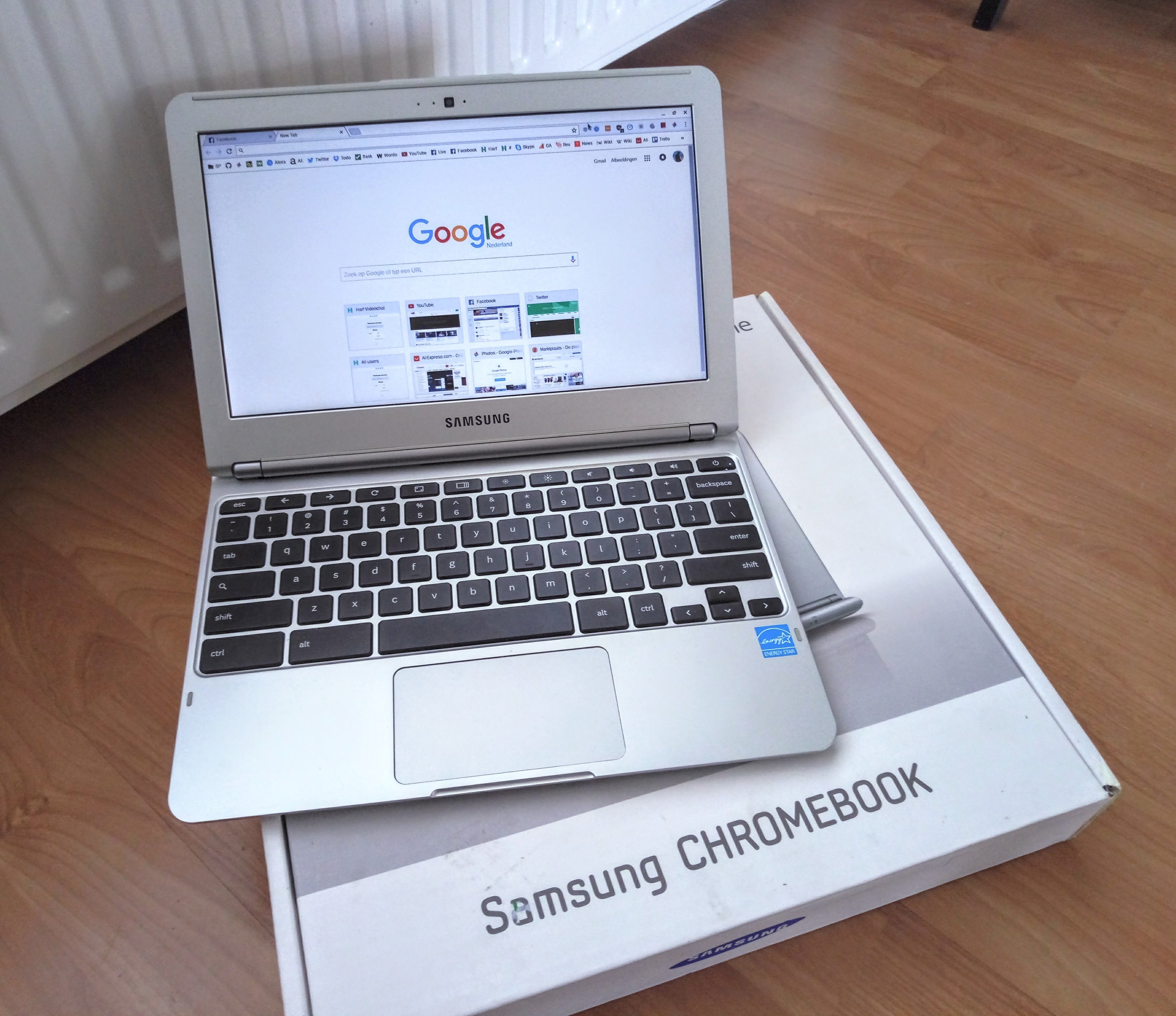
Samsung Series 3 Chromebook

In October 2012, the Series 3 Chromebook was introduced at a San Francisco event with the Samsung Chromebook XE303. The device was cheaper, thinner and lighter than the Chromebook 550. Google marketed the Series 3 as the computer for everyone, due to its simple operating system (ChromeOS) and affordable price. Target markets included students and first-time computer users, as well as households looking for an extra computer.

The lower price proved a watershed for some reviewers. New York Times technology columnist David Pogue reversed his earlier thumbs-down verdict on the Chromebook, writing that "$250 changes everything." The price is half that of an "iPad, even less than an iPad Mini or an iPod Touch. And you’re getting a laptop." He wrote that the Chromebook does many of the things people use computers and laptops for: playing flash videos, and opening Microsoft Office documents. "In other words, Google is correct when it asserts that the Chromebook is perfect for schools, second computers in homes and businesses who deploy hundreds of machines."

CNET's review of the Series 3 Chromebook was even more favorable, saying the machine largely delivered as a computer for students and as an additional computer for a household—especially for users who are already using Google Web applications like Google Docs, Google Drive, and Gmail. "It's got workable if not standout hardware, its battery life is good, it switches on quickly, and the $249 price tag means it's not as much of a commitment as the $550 Samsung Series 5 550 that arrived in May." The review subtracted points for performance. "It's fine for many tasks, but power users accustomed to having more than a couple dozen browser tabs open should steer clear."

==== Samsung Chromebook 3 ====
The Chromebook 3 is distinct from and distinguished from the similarly named Samsung Series 3 in several respects: newer (released 2016), different architecture (Intel Celeron N3050 instead of Exynos 5 Dual ARM Cortex), thinner (0.7"), and less expensive (about $100 less than the Series 3); while remaining a full implementation of ChromeOS.

==== Samsung Galaxy Chromebook ====
In 2020, Samsung introduced the Galaxy Chromebook, a high-end 2-in-1 laptop under the Galaxy branding for $999. Reviews praised the 4K AMOLED display, thin and light body, addition of the S-Pen, and speedy Intel Core i5-10210U performance. But they also criticized its poor battery life and heat output.

==== Samsung Chromebook 4 and 4+ ====
In October 2019, Samsung announced the Chromebook 4 (11.6") and 4+ (15.6") models. Both continue the budget model Chromebook line with a dual core Intel Celeron N4000 processor. The 4+ has a larger display and has model choices up to 6 GB RAM. Reviews praised the cheap price and comfortable keyboard but criticized the terrible displays.

==== Samsung Galaxy Chromebook 2 ====
The follow-on to the Galaxy Chromebook, the Galaxy Chromebook 2 was introduced in 2021. With a cheaper price, lower FHD QLED display, lower Core i3 processor, and no stylus, it is largely a downgrade from the previous model. It is intended that these changes improve the battery life.

=== HP ===
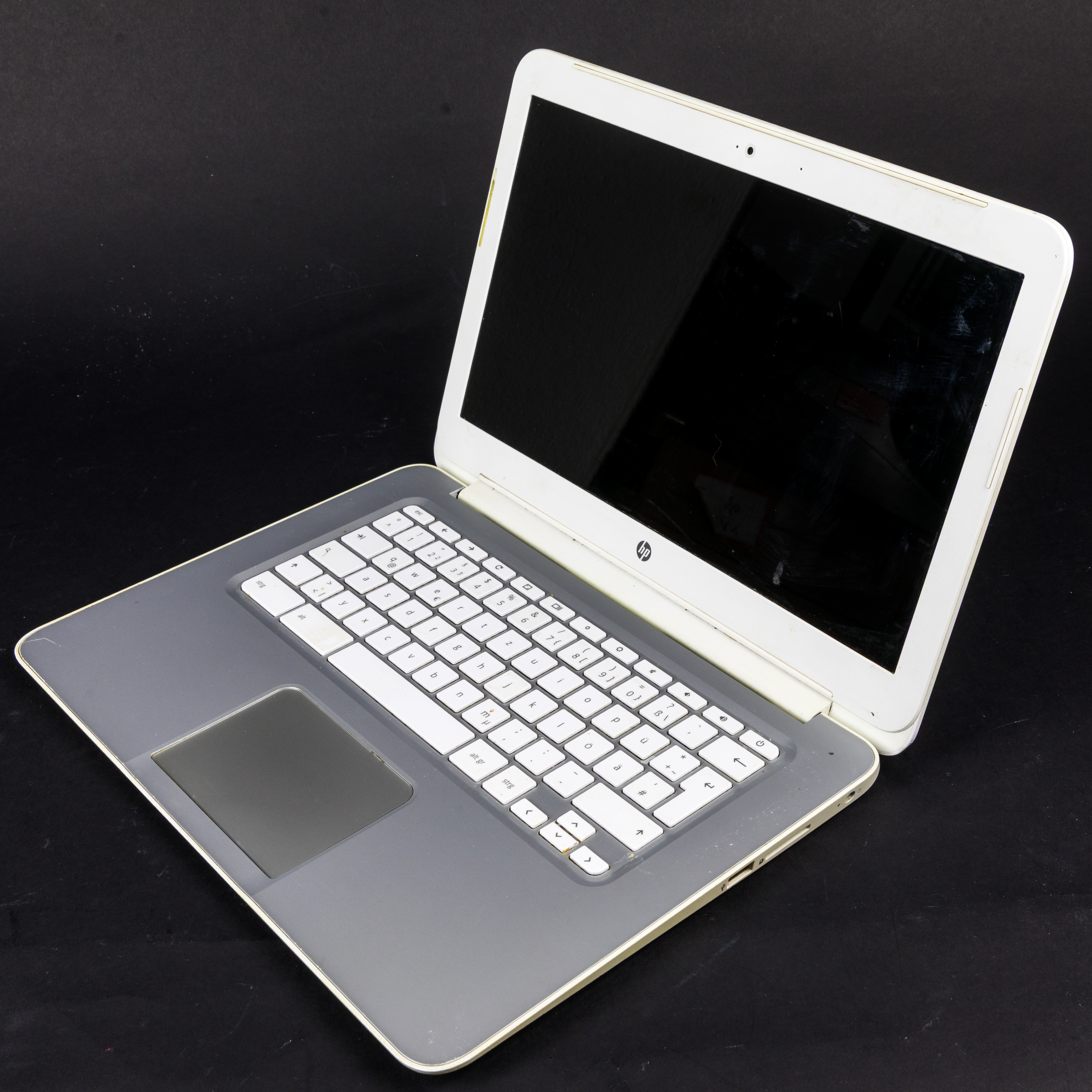
HP Pavilion 14 Chromebook

HP's first Chromebook, and the largest Chromebook on the market at that time, was the Pavilion 14 Chromebook launched February 3, 2013. It had an Intel Celeron 847 CPU and either 2 GB or 4 GB of RAM. Battery life was not long, at just over 4 hours, but the larger form factor made it more friendly for all-day use. HP introduced the Chromebook 11 on October 8, 2013, in the US. In December 2013, Google and HP recalled 145,000 chargers due to overheating. Sales were halted, resuming with a redesigned charger the following month. The HP Chromebook 14 was announced September 11, 2013 with an Intel Haswell Celeron processor, USB 3.0 ports, and 4G broadband. An updated version of the Chromebook lineup was announced on September 3, 2014. The 11-inch models included an Intel processor while the 14-inch models featured a fanless design powered by a Nvidia Tegra K1 processor. HP Chromebooks are available in several colors.

== Desktop variants ==
Three types of desktop computers also run ChromeOS.

=== Chromebox ===
Classed as small form-factor PCs, Chromeboxes typically feature a power switch and a set of ports: local area network, USB, DVI-D, DisplayPort, and audio. As with Chromebooks, Chromeboxes employ solid-state memory and support Web applications, but require an external monitor, keyboard, and pointing device.

=== Chromebase ===
Chromebase is an "all-in-one" ChromeOS device. The first model was released by LG Electronics, which integrated a screen, speakers, 1.3-megapixel webcam and microphone, with a suggested retail price of $350. LG unveiled the product in January 2014, at International CES in Las Vegas.

=== Chromebit ===
The Chromebit is a stick PC running on Google's ChromeOS operating system. When placed in the HDMI port of a television or monitor, this device turns that display into a personal computer. Chromebit allows adding a keyboard and mouse over Bluetooth or USB port.

HDMI does not provide power to connected devices, so the Chromebit is supplied power from either an external USB power supply or draws power via a USB port on the monitor.

As of 2020, it no longer receives updates.

== See also ==
- ChromiumOS
- Cloudbook
- Netbook
- Thin client
