= Cristiano Amon =

Electronics engineer

Cristiano R. Amon
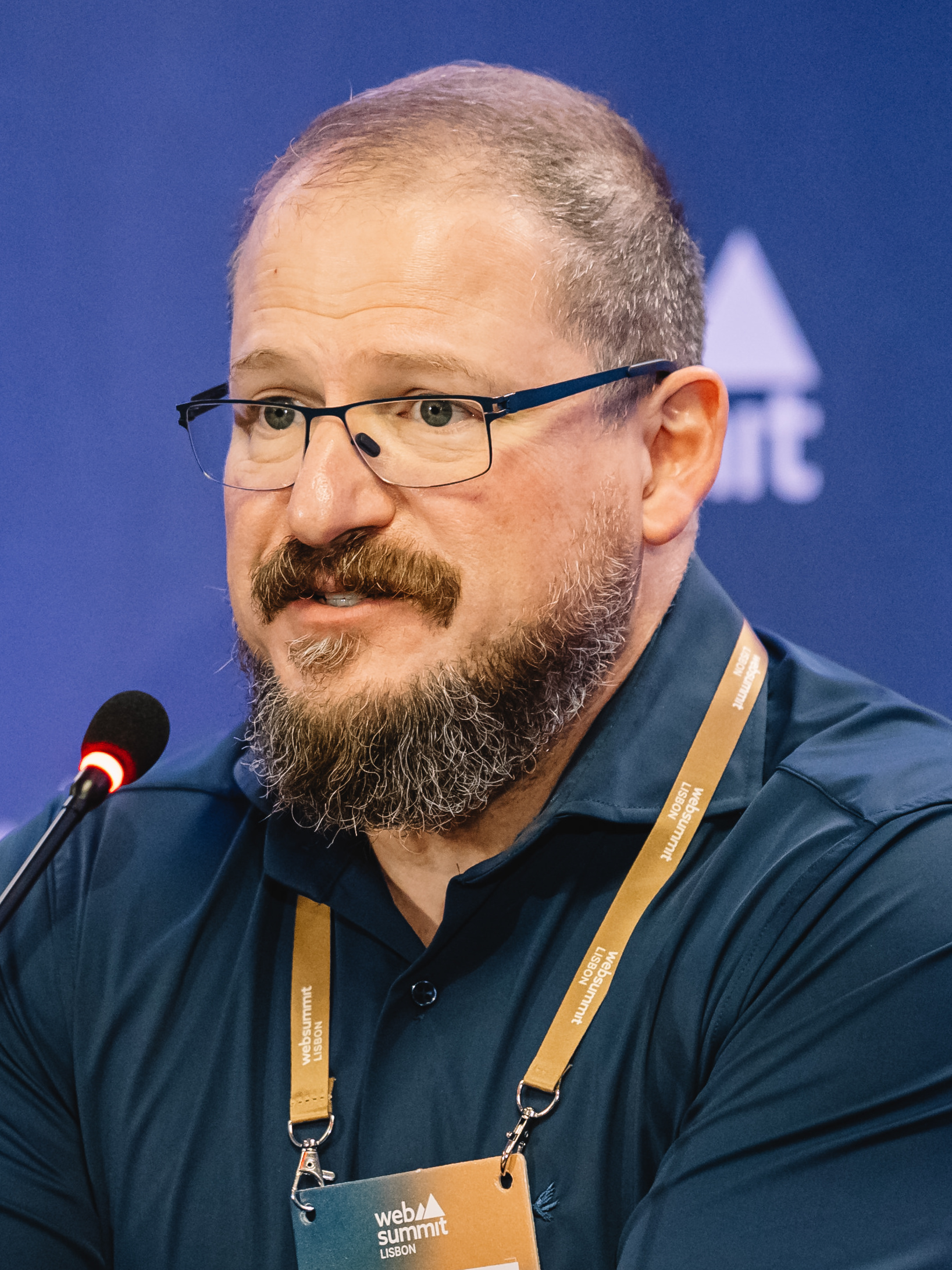
- Amon in 2025
- Born: June 21, 1970 (age 56); Campinas, Brazil
- Education: Universidade Estadual de Campinas
- Occupations: Electronics engineer and businessman
- Title: CEO, Qualcomm
- Predecessor: Steve Mollenkopf

Cristiano Amon (born c. 1970) is a Brazilian electrical engineer and businessman. He is the chief executive officer (CEO) and president of Qualcomm, a semiconductor research and development company. Amon began his career working on wireless technology for early cell phone networks. He oversaw Qualcomm's 4G and 5G technology, used in most Android devices. He also played a role in Qualcomm's diversification beyond the cell phone industry and negotiated for more processors from suppliers during shortages caused by the COVID-19 pandemic.

== Early life and education ==
Amon was born in Brazil. He grew up in Campinas, state of São Paulo, Brazil. His father was an electrical engineer and Amon chose to study electrical engineering at the Universidade Estadual de Campinas as well. Early on, he developed an interest in radio communications. He earned a bachelor's degree in electrical engineering at that university in 1992. At the time, the first generation of cellular radio (1G) was in use.

== Career ==
=== Early career ===
Amon started his career working for telecommunications companies during the early development of cell phone networks. His first position out of college was with NEC's Brazilian arm. For that position, he moved to Tokyo, Japan, and frequently travelled to San Diego, California, to meet with Qualcomm. In 1996, Amon was hired by Qualcomm to help the company expand in Latin America.

A few years later, Amon left Qualcomm. He worked for Ericsson for a short while, then joined VeloCom, an investment firm focused on the telecommunications industry. While there, he was assigned to work at Vésper, a struggling telecom company that was nearing bankruptcy. Amon worked for the Brazilian telecom company as its chief technology officer and chief operating officer until it was profitable. Then, Vésper was sold to competitor Embratel in 2003.

=== Qualcomm ===
In 2004, he joined Qualcomm again. He received several promotions over the years, working as SVP of product management, EVP of Qualcomm Technologies, and President of Qualcomm's CDMA division.

Amon was an important figure in the development of Qualcomm's 4G technology and the growth of Qualcomm's Snapdragon semiconductors. He also expanded Qualcomm's sales with smartphone manufacturers in China. Amon oversaw Qualcomm's expansion outside of cell phones into semiconductors used in cars, computers, 5G infrastructure, robots, industrial applications, virtual reality devices, and other electronic devices.

During Steven Mollenkopf's tenure as CEO of Qualcomm, Amon was responsible for Qualcomm's 5G strategy. He was responsible for improvements in Qualcomm's radio processors that are partially responsible for Qualcomm's market-share in 5G devices. Amon was appointed President of Qualcomm in 2018 by then-CEO Mollenkopf. He led a $1.4 billion acquisition of a company founded by former Apple executives called Nuvia and re-focused it on CPUs for consumer products, instead of data centers.

==== CEO ====
In June 2021, he was promoted to the top position as CEO of the entire company. This was consistent with Qualcomm's history of appointing engineers to the CEO position. His predecessors were Irwin M. Jacobs (co-founder), Paul E. Jacobs and Steven Mollenkopf. A first challenge for him in his new position was to alleviate the shortage of integrated circuits for the customers of Qualcomm. Shortly after Amon was appointed to the CEO position, the COVID-19 pandemic caused supply shortages for the processors used in Qualcomm's chips. Amon secured a competitive advantage for Qualcomm by successfully negotiating for more processors than competitors were able to get from suppliers. Amon indicated his goals to expand in the fields around augmented reality, virtual reality and automotive technology.

In 2023, Amon's total compensation from Qualcomm was $23.5 million, representing a CEO-to-median worker pay ratio of 223-to-1.

== Affiliations ==
Amon is a member of the Technology CEO Council and a member of the US-China Business Council.

He is a member of the President's Export Council. As of 2022, he is Chairman of the Semiconductor Industry Association.

== Honours ==
Amon was given an honorary doctorate from his alma mater UNICAMP (Universidade Estadual de Campinas), São Paulo.

In August 2025, Amon made Time Magazine's list of 100 Most Influential People in AI.
