= Googlebook OS =

Android-based operating system developed by Google

- Developer: Google; Google DeepMind (AI core)
- OS family: Android
- Source model: Closed-source
- Initial release: October 4, 2026; 47 days ago
- Marketing target: Personal computers (Tablets, Laptops, Desktops)
- Package manager: APK-based
- Supported platforms: ARM64, x64
- Kernel type: Monolithic (Linux kernel)
- Influenced by: Android; ChromeOS
- Preceded by: ChromeOS
- Official website: googlebook.google

Googlebook OS (codenamed Aluminium OS) is a desktop operating system created and developed by Google and Google DeepMind for the Googlebook series of computers and Chromebooks. It is a fusion between Android and ChromeOS, intended to replace the latter, and competes primarily with Microsoft's Windows and Apple's macOS. It was released on October 4, 2026.

== History ==
After some rumours, Google confirmed in July 2025 that ChromeOS will "merge" with Android under one unified platform. It was formally announced at the Snapdragon Summit in September 2025. Internally, it was known as codename Aluminium.

The existing ChromeOS will be replaced by a desktop-optimized Android-based operating system. Both are Linux-based. The same Android software would run on desktop and mobile and be adapted for the different display sizes. Like ChromeOS, the desktop version of Aluminium will work on both ARM and x86 processors. The latter port is expected to be the first mainline maintained x86 architecture version of Android.

The new OS was announced on 12 May 2026, during Google I/O. It will be used by Googlebooks, a line of premium laptops by third-party OEMs, and many Chromebooks will also be able to use the new operating system. The company clarified that Aluminium was a codename during development and would not be the actual name, and that the actual name would be unveiled later in the year.

The new OS is only intended to replace the consumer version of ChromeOS, as Google intends to continue supporting ChromeOS for enterprise and education users.

A beta GSI build of the OS, based on Android 17 and compiled for ARM64 devices, was leaked on 12 May 2026 and was hosted by MysticGSI on Telegram, where it is still available to download (shared via YouTube). The build string is CL2B.260330.037.

The new OS was given a name on 21 September 2026, that being Googlebook OS.

== Features ==
Googlebook OS is heavily integrated with Google Gemini artificial intelligence as a core feature; one feature demonstrated is "Magic Pointer", where shaking the cursor allows the user to contextually select items on-screen to receive suggestions and create a Gemini prompt. It supports integration with Android smartphones, including a dedicated taskbar button for accessing apps mirrored from the phone, and transferring of data such as files between devices.

The OS has a terminal app to access a Debian Linux command-line environment. With this, the user can install and run developer tools, code environments, and access other Linux applications. It expands the device's capabilities for advanced tasks and software development.

== See also ==
- Fuchsia (operating system)
