= FydeOS =

- A desktop screenshot of FydeOS (v21)
- Developer: Fyde Innovations
- OS family: GNU/Linux
- Working state: Active
- Initial release: October 28, 2016; 9 years ago
- Latest release: 23.0 / August 20, 2026; 44 days ago
- Supported platforms: x86, x64, ARM, ARM64
- License: Proprietary
- Preceded by: FlintOS
- Official website: fydeos.io

FydeOS is an operating system developed as a fork of the open-source project ChromiumOS. It uses the Linux kernel and integrates both a web browser platform and container technologies. The interface is similar to Chrome OS, and it is compatible with hardware platforms based on x86 and ARM architectures. Devices running FydeOS support the latest web application standards, compatibility with Android apps, and a Linux environment, providing a user experience similar to that of a Chromebook.

== History ==
FydeOS was originally named Flint OS. It was founded in 2015 and released version 0.1 on October 28, 2016, initially for Raspberry Pi hardware. It quickly gained attention from some Raspberry Pi enthusiasts.

On March 6, 2018, FlintOS was acquired by Neverware. The UK-based FlintOS company and its overseas operations became part of Neverware, while a localized version was rebranded as FydeOS.
