= ChromiumOS =

Free open-source operating system designed by Google

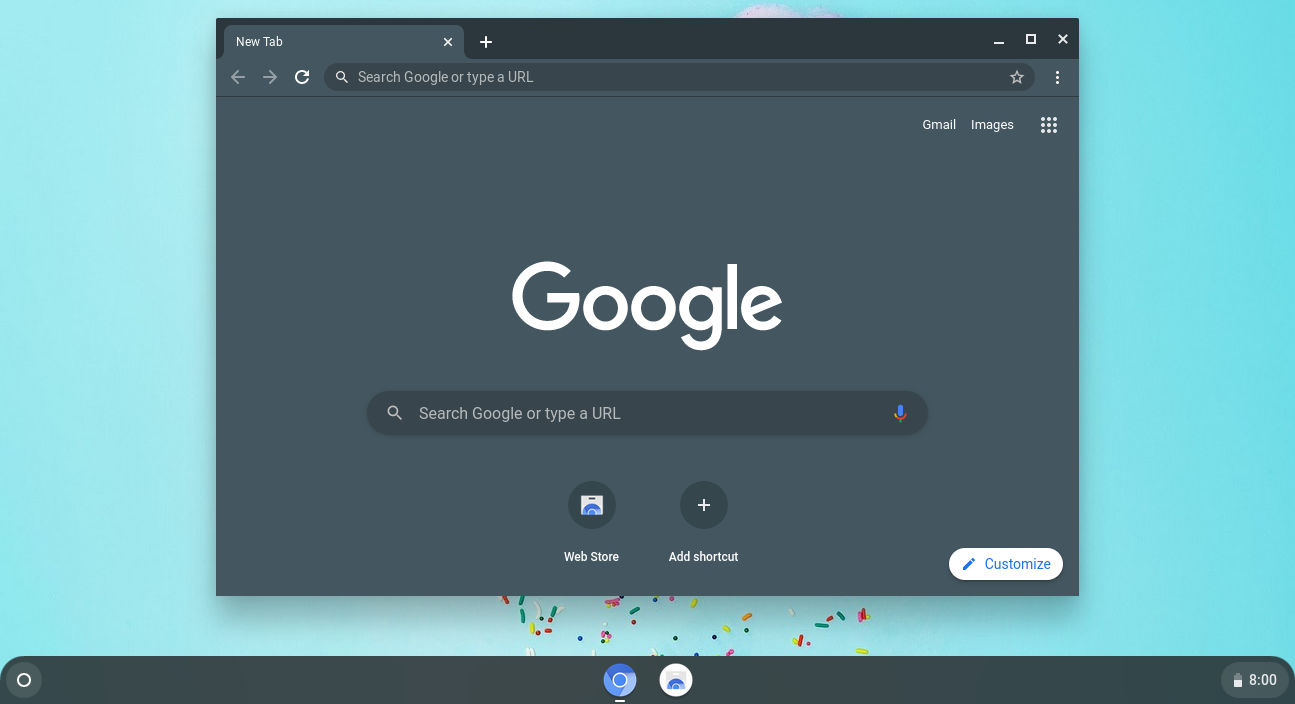
- Chromium OS (85.0.4163.0) displaying the New Tab Page
- Developer: Google
- OS family: Unix-like (Linux)
- Working state: Current
- Source model: Open source
- Initial release: November 19, 2009; 16 years ago
- Repository: chromium.googlesource.com/chromiumos/
- Update method: Rolling release
- Supported platforms: IA-32, x86-64, ARM, ARM64
- Kernel type: Monolithic (Linux kernel)
- Userland: Ozone (Display manager), X11, GNU
- Default user interface: Chromium, Aura Shell (Ash)
- License: Various open source licenses (mainly BSD-style licenses and GPL)
- Official website: www.chromium.org/chromium-os

ChromiumOS (formerly styled as Chromium OS) is a free and open-source Linux distribution designed for running web applications and browsing the World Wide Web. It is the open-source version of ChromeOS, a Linux distribution made by Google.

ChromiumOS is based on the Linux kernel, like ChromeOS, but its principal user interface is the Chromium web browser rather than the Google Chrome browser. ChromiumOS also includes the Portage package manager, which was originally developed for Gentoo Linux. Because ChromiumOS and ChromeOS use a browser engine for the user interface, they are oriented toward web applications rather than application software or mobile apps.

Google first published the ChromiumOS source code in November 19, 2009.

== Architecture ==
Chromium's architecture is three-tiered, consisting of "three major components":

- The Chromium-based browser and the window manager
- System-level software and user-land services: the Linux kernel, drivers, connection manager, and so on
- Firmware

== Availability ==
ChromiumOS was first made available in compiled form by hobbyists. More organized efforts have emerged over time, including a few manufacturers that have shipped devices with the operating system pre-installed.

=== Builds and forks ===
By May 2010, compiled versions of the work-in-progress source code had been downloaded from the Internet more than a million times.

The most popular version, entitled "ChromiumOS Flow", was created by Liam McLoughlin, a then 17-year-old college student in Liverpool, England, posting under the name "Hexxeh". McLoughlin's build boots from a USB memory stick and included features that Google engineers had not yet implemented, such as support for the Java programming language. While Google did not expect that hobbyists would use and evaluate ChromiumOS ahead of its official release, Sundar Pichai, Google's vice president of product management (now the CEO) said that "what people like Hexxeh are doing is amazing to see." Pichai said the early releases were an unintended consequence of open source development. "If you decide to do open-source projects, you have to be open all the way."

Hexxeh's work continued into the following year. He announced "ChromiumOS Lime" in December 2010, and in January 2011, released "Luigi", an application designed to "jailbreak"/"root" the Google Cr-48 "Mario" prototype hardware and install a generic BIOS. The developer made the builds available in virtual machine format on March 13, 2011. With no official build of ChromiumOS forthcoming from Google, Hexxeh's "vanilla" nightly builds of ChromiumOS were the principal resource for people wanting to try ChromiumOS. Hexxeh stopped uploading his builds on April 20, 2013.

More recent versions of ChromiumOS are available from Arnoldthebat, who previously maintained daily and weekly builds along with usage guidelines and help. In July 2012, Chromium Build Kit was released. It automatically compiles a developer build and installs ChromiumOS on a USB drive.

In 2015, New York City-based Neverware produced a ChromiumOS fork called CloudReady aimed at the educational market, with the intention of extending the life of older PCs and laptops. A subsequent version can dual-boot Neverware and the Windows operating system (until v64). In 2018, Neverware acquired Flint OS, a UK-based and China-based company. In 2020, Neverware was acquired by Google, and a similar "ChromeOS Flex" was released into beta in February 2022.

Flint OS became FydeOS, which is based on Chromium OS to run on Intel-based computers, and the Raspberry Pi 4 family.

=== Hardware ===
Some devices have shipped with ChromiumOS preinstalled. In May 2012, Dell also released a new build for the Dell Inspiron Mini 10v netbook, following up on an earlier build released almost 18 months earlier. The build did not support audio, but was bootable from a USB drive. Other devices include the Kogan Agora Chromium Laptop by the Australian company Kogan and the Xi3 Modular Computer, introduced by the company of the same name. In late 2015, a team headed by Dylan Callahan released a beta ChromiumOS port to the Raspberry Pi 2 single-board computer. In 2016, Flint Innovations released a ChromiumOS port for the latest Raspberry Pi 3/B model named Flint OS for RPi. Subsequently, this project has been fully open-sourced at GitHub, with all the files and detailed instructions to re-create the build.

== Trademark dispute ==
In June 2011, ISYS Technologies, based in Salt Lake City, sued Google in a Utah district court, claiming rights to the name "Chromium" and, by default, Chromebook and Chromebox. The suit sought to stop Google and its hardware and marketing partners from selling Chromebooks. The suit was later dismissed and, as part of an undisclosed settlement between Google and ISYS, ISYS abandoned its trademark efforts.

== See also ==
- Android (operating system)
- App Runtime for Chrome
- CoreOS
- Chromium (web browser)
- Google Fuchsia
- Firefox OS
- Google Chrome
- ChromeOS
- Webconverger – an operating system based on Firefox
- Gentoo Linux
