= CTL =

CTL can refer to:

- Champions Tennis League, a tennis championship league in India
- Chronic training load, cumulative sports training
- Circuit Total Limitation, US standard for electrical panels
- Coal to liquids, coal liquefaction
- Combat Tank, Light such as the Marmon-Herrington CTLS
- Commission de transport de la Ville de Laval
- Complex Text Layout in typesetting
- Core Transfer Library, a list of college courses for transfer credit among educational institutions in Indiana
- Cut-to-length logging
- Cytotoxic T lymphocyte
- Constructive total loss, in marine insurance

== Companies ==
- Computer Technology Limited, a British computer manufacturer of the 1970s and 1980s
- Communications Technology Laboratory, a NIST laboratory since 2010
- CTL Corporation, manufacturer of Chromebooks

== Computing ==
- Certificate Transparency Logs
- Computation tree logic, a temporal logic
- Control key, a computer keyboard key
- CTL timecode, a timecode used on video tape

== Culture ==
- Changeling: The Lost, a tabletop role-playing game

== Transportation ==
- Centralia, Washington (Amtrak station), USA, Amtrak station code
- Charleville Airport, Queensland, Australia (IATA airport code)
