= Compatibility =

Compatibility may refer to:

== Computing ==
- Backward compatibility, in which newer systems can understand data generated by older ones
- Compatibility card, an expansion card for hardware emulation of another device
- Compatibility layer, components that allow for non-native support of components
  - Compatibility mode, software mechanism in which a software emulates an older version of software
- Computer compatibility, of a line of machines
  - IBM PC compatible, computers that are generally similar to the original IBM PC, XT, or AT
- Forward compatibility, in which older systems can understand data generated by newer ones
- Hardware compatibility, between different pieces of computer hardware
- License compatibility, of software licenses
- Pin compatibility, in devices that have the same functions assigned to the same particular pins
- Software compatibility, between different pieces of software
  - Software incompatibility
- Unicode compatibility characters, characters encoded solely to maintain round-trip convertibility with other standards

== Science and mathematics ==
- Biocompatibility, a description of materials' ability to remain performant in biological tissues
- Blood compatibility, determines what type of donor blood to use in blood transfusions
- Compatibility, a property of splits in phylogenetic trees
- Compatibility (chemical), how stable a substance is when mixed with another substance
- Compatibility (geochemistry), how readily a particular trace element substitutes for a major element within a mineral
- Compatibility (mechanics), the study of compatible deformations in continuum mechanics
- Electromagnetic compatibility, which studies the unintentional generation, propagation, and reception of electromagnetic energy
- Histocompatibility, the degree of similarity of cell surface proteins between individuals
- Genetic compatibility, how well the genes of parents function together in their offspring
- Consistency, logical compatibility between two or more propositions
- Compatible relation, a binary relation that commutes with each operation of an algebraic structure

== Other uses ==
- Astrological compatibility, a branch of astrology that studies relationships by comparing natal horoscopes
- Compatibilism, a philosophical position
- Interpersonal compatibility, the long-term interaction between two or more individuals in terms of the ease and comfort of communication
