= CTLS =

CTLS can refer to:

- Center for Transnational Legal Studies, a global educational center for the study of transnational law
- Marmon-Herrington CTLS (Combat Tank Light Series), a series of World War II-era U.S. light tanks
- Flight Design CTLS, a German light sport aircraft
- CTLS, a fictional television station in Toronto, Canada, on the TV series E.N.G.

== See also ==
- CTL (disambiguation)
