= Ausdroid =

Ausdroid Media Pty Ltd
- Company type: Privately held company
- Industry: Media
- Founded: Sydney 2010; 16 years ago
- Founder: Buzz Moody and Chris Rowland
- Headquarters: Sydney, Australia
- Area served: Australia
- Key people: Chris Rowland (Editor and managing director); Phil Tan (Deputy-Editor)
- Number of employees: 8 (July 2018)
- Website: ausdroid.net

Ausdroid, formerly known as Android Australia, is a site containing news about smartphones, smart accessories and personal technology. The site started writing about just the Android operating system, but has expanded to a broader personal technology coverage. The site is produced by Ausdroid Media Pty Ltd.

The site's main focus is a news blog that contains news regarding Android, Google Inc. and its parent company Alphabet Inc. along with its web cloud-based ChromeOS operating system.

== Staff ==
Ausdroid has two editorial staff:

- Chris Rowland: Publisher and Editor
- Phil Tann: Deputy Editor

== Writing Staff ==
- Phil Tann: Principal
- Alex Dennis: Journalist
- Duncan Jaffrey: Journalist
- Neerav Bhatt: Journalist
- Alex Choros
