= Computer compatibility =

Technological compatibility of software and hardware

A family of computer models is said to be compatible if certain software that run on one of the models can also be run on all other models of the family. The computer models may differ in performance, reliability or some other characteristic. These differences may affect the outcome of the running of the software.

== Software compatibility ==
Software compatibility can refer to the compatibility that a particular software has running on a particular CPU instruction set such as x86 or ARM. Software compatibility can also refer to ability for the software to run on a particular operating system. Very rarely is a compiled software compatible with multiple different CPU architectures. Normally, an application is compiled for different CPU architectures and operating systems to allow it to be compatible with the different system.

Interpreted software, on the other hand, can normally run on many different CPU architectures and operating systems if the interpreter is available for the architecture or operating system. Software incompatibility occurs many times for new software released for a newer version of an operating system which is incompatible with the older version of the operating system because it may miss some of the features and functionality that the software depends on.

== Hardware compatibility ==
Hardware compatibility can refer to the compatibility of computer hardware components with a particular CPU architecture, bus, motherboard, peripheral or operating system. Hardware that is compatible may not always run at its highest stated performance, but it can nevertheless work with legacy components. An example is RAM chips, some of which can run at a lower (or sometimes higher) clock rate than rated. Hardware that was designed for one operating system may not work for another, if device or kernel drivers are unavailable. As an example, Android is not able to be run on a phone with iOS.

== Free and open-source software ==
Sometimes, FOSS is not compatible with proprietary hardware or specific software. This is often due to manufacturers obstructing FOSS such as by not disclosing the interfaces or other specifications needed for members of the FOSS movement to write drivers for their hardware – for instance as they wish customers to run only their own proprietary software or as they might benefit from partnerships.

== See also ==
- Compatibility layer
- Interchangeability
- Forward compatibility
- Backward compatibility
- Cross-platform
- Emulator
- Portability
- Plug compatible
- Hardware security
