= Chronic training load =

Chronic training load (CTL) is the cumulative amount of athletic training that builds up over a long period of time. CTL is especially popular as a metric in cycling among athletes who use a cycling power meter, which simplifies the collection and review of training data. The main concept is that an appropriate level of CTL will cause the body of an athlete to go through fitness adaptations. The time span over which it is measured ranges from weeks to months. CTL is often used in comparison to that of acute training load to plan or examine the results of a training program.

CTL is a reflection of the consistency, duration and intensity of the last 6 weeks to several months or more of your training. Your body's response to this training determines your current level of real-world fitness
