= CTL Corporation =

Computer manufacturer

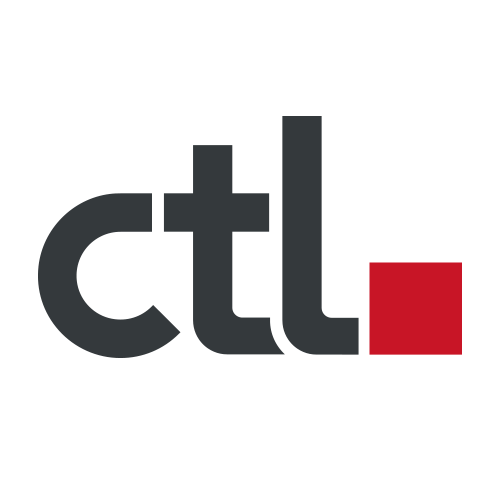
- Company type: private
- Industry: Technology
- Founded: 1989
- Headquarters: Beaverton, Oregon
- Website: ctl.net

CTL Corporation is an Oregon-based computer manufacturer that produces Chromebooks and Chromeboxes.

== Company ==
CTL was founded as Computer Technology Link Corp in 1989 and is based in Beaverton, Oregon. In 2015 it opened offices in Vigo, Spain as well. The chief executive officer is Erik Stromquist.

== Computers ==
In 1999, CTL began providing computers and technical support to the government of Malaysia and its education system. CTL began manufacturing all-in-one PCs again in the early 2010s. In 2014 CTL partnered with CryptoRig in order to produce currency-mining computer systems. In 2016 CTL Chromebooks were provided to teachers and students in Nevada education system via a legislative appropriation of $20 million passed through the Nevada State House.

In 2018 CTL partnered with Google and Sprint in order to develop a Chromebook with access to LTE mobile service, creating the Chromebook NL7 LTE. It also released the Core i7 version. In 2019 the company released the CTL Chromebook Tab Tx1, with two Cortex-A72 cores and four further Cortex-A53, and 4 GB of memory and 32 GB of storage. That year CTL also released the Chromebox CBx1-7 for mounting to visual displays.
