= Chromebox =

Small form-factor PC running Chrome OS

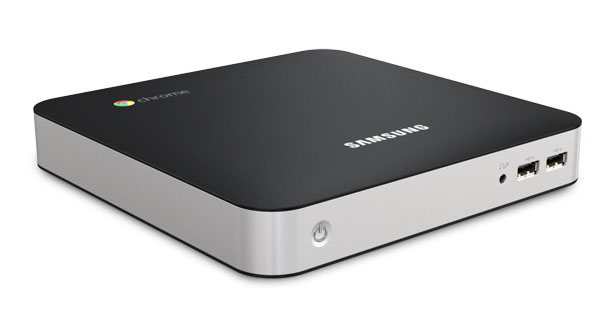
- Samsung Chromebox from front
- Manufacturer: Acer; AOpen; Asus; CTL; Dell; Google (as a bundler); Hewlett-Packard; Lenovo; Promethian, Samsung; SMART
- Introduced: May 29, 2012; 14 years ago
- Cost: $179-$999
- Processor: ARM, Intel Celeron, Core i3, Core i5, Core i7
- Memory: 2, 4, 8, or 16 GB
- Ports: USB 2.0/3.0/3.2 Gen 1 Type-A & C, Ethernet, HDMI, DisplayPort++, Micro SD, SDHC & SDXC Card Reader

A Chromebox is a small form-factor PC that runs Google's ChromeOS operating system. The first device debuted in May 2012.

== History ==
Chromeboxes, like other ChromeOS devices including Chromebook laptops, primarily support web applications, thereby relying heavily on an Internet connection for both software functionality and data storage. That connection, via a local area network, can be wireless or through an Ethernet port.

The machines are classed as small form-factor PCs and typically feature a power switch and a set of connections to support a keyboard, pointing device and one or more monitors. Solid state drives are used for storage and only wireless printers are supported. The first Chromebox, released by Samsung on May 29, 2012, ran a dual-core Intel Celeron Processor 867 at 1.3 GHz, and featured six USB 2.0 ports and two DisplayPort++ slots compatible with HDMI, DVI, and VGA.

In February 2014, Google bundled an Intel Core i7 Chromebox with a business video conferencing package, 1080p high definition camera module, external microphone/speaker and remote control. This Chromebox for Meetings system retailed for $999 plus a $250 annual management fee, waived the first year—a cost thousands of dollars less than other unified videoconferencing systems, including those from Cisco and Polycom. The system employed a Google Hangouts-like interface for up to 15 participants, a dedicated URL for sharing screens, and management accounts for scheduling meetings. An updated system announced in November 2017 featured a 4K camera and a machine learning feature that automatically identifies and frames participants.

In March 2014, Asus established a new price at the low-end of the Chromebox market with a compact, 1.32 pound model that retailed at $179 and featured a Celeron CPU and four USB 3.0 ports. Yahoo Tech columnist David Pogue called the Asus device among the smallest, "least-expensive desktop computers ever sold", likening it to a Smart car. "You won’t be hauling lumber from Home Depot in it, but it’s a terrific deal—and most days, it’ll get you where you want to go." In May, Asus released a faster model with an Intel Core i3 processor. Hewlett-Packard entered the market in June with a Chromebox powered by an Intel Celeron processor, optionally bundling a keyboard and mouse. In August, Acer introduced two models that could stand vertically and provided some business-oriented features, including encryption and fast deletion of local data. In September, Dell entered the market with an entry-level machine, as well as Dell's implementation of the Google video conferencing system.

In August 2015, AOpen announced a family of Chromeboxes designed principally for driving the content of digital commercial signage. The models were ruggedized for on-site operation.

The capability to run Android apps with ChromeOS devices, introduced by Google in 2016 and realized by certain Chromebooks in 2017, seemed to bypass Chromeboxes until a cluster of new Chromebox offerings appeared in 2018, including Acer, Asus, and HP. Oregon-based CTL (Compute Teach Learn), maker of Chromebooks since 2014, launched its first Chromebox in March 2018.

In late 2020, four major Chromebox manufacturers, HP, Acer, Asus, and CTL, announced plans for new Chromebox models based on the 10th generation Intel Comet Lake architecture.

== Models ==
Available	Brand	Model	Processor	RAM	Storage	Size	Auto Update Expiration date
2012-05	Samsung	Series 3 XE300M22-A01US	Celeron B840	4 GB	16 GB SSD	1.3 in × 7.6 in × 7.6 in (3.3 cm × 19.3 cm × 19.3 cm)	Mar 2018
2013-01	Samsung	Series 3 XE300M22-A02US	Intel Core i5-2450M	4 GB	16 GB SSD	1.3 in × 7.6 in × 7.6 in (3.3 cm × 19.3 cm × 19.3 cm)	Mar 2018
2013-03	Samsung	Series 3 XE300M22-B01US	Celeron B840	4 GB	16 GB SSD	1.57 in × 8.10 in × 8.10 in (4.0 cm × 20.6 cm × 20.6 cm)	Mar 2018
2014-02	Google	Chromebox for Meetings (Note: Equipment bundle)	Intel Core i7	4 GB	16 GB M.2 SSD	12.4 in × 12.4 in × 4.2 in (31 cm × 31 cm × 11 cm)	???
2014-03	Asus	Chromebox-M004U	Intel Celeron 2955U	2 GB	16 GB M.2 SSD	4.88 in × 4.88 in × 1.65 in (12.4 cm × 12.4 cm × 4.2 cm)	???
2014-05	Asus	Chromebox-M075U	Intel Core i3-4010U	2 or 4 GB	16 GB M.2 SSD	4.88 in × 4.88 in × 1.65 in (12.4 cm × 12.4 cm × 4.2 cm)	???
2014-06	Hewlett-Packard	HP Chromebox CB1	Intel Celeron 2955U	2 GB / 4 GB / 8 GB	16 GB (128 GB Or more max) M.2 SSD	4.96 in × 4.88 in × 1.53 in (12.6 cm × 12.4 cm × 3.9 cm)	???
2014-06	Hewlett-Packard	HP Chromebox	Intel Core i7-4600U	4 GB / 8 GB / 16 GB	16 GB (128 GB Or more max) M.2 SSD	4.96 in × 4.88 in × 1.53 in (12.6 cm × 12.4 cm × 3.9 cm)	???
2014-08	Acer	Chromebox CXI	Intel Celeron 2957U	2 or 4 GB	16 GB	6.5 in × 5.1 in × 1.3 in (16.5 cm × 13.0 cm × 3.3 cm)	???
2014-09	Dell	Dell Chromebox	Intel Celeron 2955U	2 GB	16 GB	4.9 in × 4.9 in × 1.7 in (12.4 cm × 12.4 cm × 4.3 cm)	Sep 2019
2014-09	Dell	Dell Chromebox	Intel Core i3-4030U	4 GB	16 GB	4.9 in × 4.9 in × 1.7 in (12.4 cm × 12.4 cm × 4.3 cm)	Sep 2019
2014-09	Dell	Dell Chromebox for Meetings	Intel Core i7-4600U	4 GB	16 GB	4.9 in × 4.9 in × 1.7 in (12.4 cm × 12.4 cm × 4.3 cm)	Aug 2019
2014-08	Asus	Chromebox CN60	Intel Celeron 2955U	2 GB / 4 GB / 16 GB	16 GB (128 GB Or more max) M.2 SSD	1.6 in × 4.9 in × 4.9 in (4.1 cm × 12.4 cm × 12.4 cm)	Sep 2019
2017-07	Asus	Chromebox 2 CN62	Intel Celeron 3215U	2 GB / 4 GB / 16 GB	16 GB (128 GB Or more max) M.2 SSD	1.6 in × 4.9 in × 4.9 in (4.1 cm × 12.4 cm × 12.4 cm)	Jun 2021
2015-03	Acer	Chromebox CXI	Intel Core i3-4030U (Haswell)	4 or 8 GB	16 GB	6.5 in × 5.1 in × 1.3 in (16.5 cm × 13.0 cm × 3.3 cm)	???
2015-05	Lenovo	ThinkCentre Chromebox	Intel Celeron 3205U	4 GB	16 GB SSD	7.0 in × 7.2 in × 1.4 in (17.8 cm × 18.3 cm × 3.6 cm)	Jun 2021
2015-08	AOPEN	Chromebox Commercial	Intel N2930 (quad core Atom)	4 GB	32 GB	6.5 in × 6.2 in × 0.9 in (16.5 cm × 15.7 cm × 2.3 cm)	Sep 2021
2018-04	Acer	Acer Chromebox CXI3 4GKM	Intel Celeron 3865U	4 GB	32 GB	5.9 in × 5.8 in × 1.6 in (15.0 cm × 14.7 cm × 4.1 cm)	Jun 2025
2018-04	Acer	Acer Chromebox CXI3 I38GKM	Intel Core i3-7130U	8 GB	64 GB	5.9 in × 5.8 in × 1.6 in (15.0 cm × 14.7 cm × 4.1 cm)	Jun 2025
2018-04	Acer	Acer Chromebox CXI3 I58GKM	Intel Core i5-8250U	8 GB	64 GB	5.9 in × 5.8 in × 1.6 in (15.0 cm × 14.7 cm × 4.1 cm)	Jun 2025
2018-04	Acer	Acer Chromebox CXI3 I716GKM	Intel Core i7-8550U	16 GB	64 GB	5.9 in × 5.8 in × 1.6 in (15.0 cm × 14.7 cm × 4.1 cm)	Jun 2025
2018-06	Asus	Chromebox 3 N017U	Intel Celeron 3865U	4 GB	32 GB	14.9 cm × 14.9 cm × 4 cm (5.9 in × 5.9 in × 1.6 in)	Jun 2025
2018-06	Asus	Chromebox 3 N018U	Intel Core i3-7100U	4 GB	32 GB	14.9 cm × 14.9 cm × 4 cm (5.9 in × 5.9 in × 1.6 in)	Jun 2025
2018-06	Asus	Chromebox 3 N019U	Intel Core i3-7100U	8 GB	32 GB	14.9 cm × 14.9 cm × 4 cm (5.9 in × 5.9 in × 1.6 in)	Jun 2025
2018-06	Asus	Chromebox 3 N020U	Intel Core i7-8550U	8 GB	32 GB	14.9 cm × 14.9 cm × 4 cm (5.9 in × 5.9 in × 1.6 in)	Jun 2025
2018-06	Asus	Chromebox 3 N3299U	Intel Core i3-8130U	4 GB	32 GB	14.9 cm × 14.9 cm × 4 cm (5.9 in × 5.9 in × 1.6 in)	Jun 2025
2018-06	Asus	Chromebox 3 N3289U	Intel Core i3-8130U	8 GB	128 GB	14.9 cm × 14.9 cm × 4 cm (5.9 in × 5.9 in × 1.6 in)	Jun 2025
2018-06	Asus	Chromebox 3 N5327U	Intel Core i5-8250U	8 GB	128 GB	14.9 cm × 14.9 cm × 4 cm (5.9 in × 5.9 in × 1.6 in)	Jun 2025
2018-06	HP	HP Chromebox G2 3VD02UT	Intel Celeron 3865U	4 GB	32 GB	5.87 in × 5.87 in × 1.57 in (14.9 cm × 14.9 cm × 4.0 cm)	Jun 2025
2018-06	HP	HP Chromebox G2 3VD03UT	Intel Core i5-7300U	8 GB	32 GB	5.87 in × 5.87 in × 1.57 in (14.9 cm × 14.9 cm × 4.0 cm)	Jun 2025
2018-06	HP	HP Chromebox G2 3VD04UT	Intel Core i7-8650U	8 GB	32 GB	5.87 in × 5.87 in × 1.57 in (14.9 cm × 14.9 cm × 4.0 cm)	Jun 2025
2018-06	HP	HP Chromebox G2 3VD05UT	Intel Core i7-8650U	16 GB	64 GB	5.87 in × 5.87 in × 1.57 in (14.9 cm × 14.9 cm × 4.0 cm)	Jun 2025
2018-07	CTL	CTL Chromebox CBX1	Intel Celeron 3865U	4 GB / 8 GB / 16 GB	32 GB SSD	5.83 in × 5.85 in × 1.62 in (14.8 cm × 14.9 cm × 4.1 cm)	Jun 2025
2020-12-05	Asus	Asus Chromebox 4	Intel Celeron 5205U Intel Core i3-10110U; Intel Core i5-10210U; Intel Core i7-10510U	4 GB / 8 GB / 16 GB	32 GB eMMC 64 GB eMMC; 128 GB M.2 SATA SSD; 256 GB M.2 SATA SSD; M.2 PCIE GEN3x4 256 GB SSD	14.9 cm × 14.9 cm × 4 cm (5.9 in × 5.9 in × 1.6 in)	Jun 2028
2023-03-30	Asus	Asus Chromebox 5	Intel Celeron 7305 Intel Core i7-1260P Intel Core i5-1240P Intel Core i3-1220P	8 GB / 16 GB / 32 GB	128 /256 /512 GB NVMe SSD	166.5 x 165.8 x 45.9 mm (1.27 L)	Jun 2032
