= Neverware =

American technology company

Neverware Inc
- Type: Subsidiary
- Industry: Education technology
- Founded: January 2011; 15 years ago in New York, USA
- Founder: Jonathan Hefter
- Defunct: December 16, 2020
- Fate: Acquired by Google
- Headquarters: Manhattan, USA
- Area served: Worldwide
- Products: CloudReady
- Owner: Google (100%)
- Parent: Google
- Website: www.neverware.com

Neverware Inc was a New York–based technology company and a subsidiary of Google.

It was the developer of CloudReady, a distribution of Google's ChromiumOS designed to be installed on existing computers (as opposed to Google's commercial version, ChromeOS, which is sold primarily as pre-loaded software on netbooks). Neverware marketed CloudReady as a means to reuse older computers (particularly at schools), thus reducing electronic waste.

Although the company began with an exclusive focus on the US K-12 education sector, it announced in October 2017 its intention to use its Series B funding from Google to further expand into the enterprise market. On December 16, 2020, Neverware announced that it had been acquired by Google.

== History ==
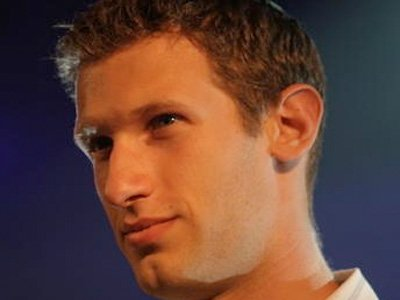
Jonathan Hefter, founder of Neverware

Jonathan Hefter began developing Neverware's core technology in 2009 after graduating from Wharton Business School at the University of Pennsylvania. In May 2010, Dogpatch Labs invited Hefter to work out of their Manhattan incubator, and in early 2011 Neverware officially formed, moved to General Assembly's Manhattan location, and began operations. Hefter remains at Neverware as chairman.

After a successful pilot program, Neverware launched in January 2013, rolling out its first product—the desktop virtualization platform PCReady—at schools in the New York City area. The product primarily targeted the K-12 school market, as a means of refurbishing older computers in preparation for wider rollouts of electronic standardized tests. By 2015, PCReady had been adopted at 10% of New York City's schools.

While early reception to PCReady was positive, it faced competition in the education market from Google's ChromeOS ecosystem (including Chromebooks), which leveraged cloud services and lightweight hardware. In response, Neverware began developing a fork of Google's open-source ChromiumOS, known as CloudReady, which was designed to "bring the benefits that many school are realizing with products like Chromebooks to a much wider group of schools for a lower price".

In February 2015, Neverware released CloudReady.

In October 2017, Neverware announced that Google would lead its Series B round of investment as a strategic partner and investor.

In March 2018, Neverware announced it would acquire Flint Innovations, the UK-based company behind Flint OS, another offshoot of ChromiumOS.

On December 16, 2020, Neverware announced that it had been acquired by Google, and that its employees would join the main ChromeOS team. The company stated that there would be no immediate changes to the CloudReady product. In July 2022, Google released ChromeOS Flex, an official offshoot of ChromeOS with a similar focus to CloudReady.

== Products ==
=== PCReady ===
Neverware's first product, PCReady, was a multiseat desktop virtualization platform, seeking to convert older computers to Windows 7–based thin clients using its remotely-managed "Juicebox" server appliance. The platform was sold as a subscription service per-client.

=== CloudReady ===
Neverware's second product, CloudReady, was a distribution of ChromiumOS targeting users and organizations wanting to install the software on existing computers. The commercial version of the product could be managed using Google's existing enterprise tools, allowing surplus hardware to be used in tandem with ChromeOS devices.

== Financing ==
Neverware was backed by a variety of technology and venture capital firms. Investors included Google, Khosla Ventures, Upfront Ventures, Thrive Capital, General Catalyst Partners, Collaborative Fund, OurCrowd, and Mark Suster.

== Recognition ==
Neverware had received media attention for its investment from Google, young founder, noteworthy cause, and projected viability. It had also attracted interest for its potential for reducing Ewaste by extending the lifespan of aging hardware. Neverware had appeared in the Wall Street Journal, the Boston Globe, the Guardian, Forbes.com, The New York Times, TechCrunch, The Verge, Engadget, and The MIT Technology Review. Neverware had also been repeatedly recognized as being a great place to work by organizations such as Crain's New York, Built in NYC, Business Intelligence Group, and Great Place to Work.
