= Unified Display Interface =

Digital video interface specification

- Type: Digital video connector

Production history
- Designed: 2006 (Abandoned 2007)
- Produced: None
- Superseded: HDMI
- Superseded by: DisplayPort

General specifications
- Length: 10.7 mm (0.42 in)
- Width: 17.3 mm (0.68 in)
- Height: 3.7 mm (0.15 in)
- Hot pluggable: Yes
- External: Yes
- Audio signal: No
- Video signal: Yes
- Pins: 22 (external); 26 (embedded)

Electrical
- Max. voltage: +5V
- Max. current: 0.5 A

Data
- Data signal: R,G,B data + clock and display data channel (TMDS)
- Width: 36 bit (maximum)
- Bitrate: 16 Gbit/s

Pinout
- External UDI receptacles for the (R)eceiver [display] and (T)ransmitter [computer]
Pin 1	Reserved connector pin. No cable connection	(NC)
Pin 2	Reserved connector pin. No cable connection	(NC)
Pin 3	Reserved connector pin. No cable connection	(NC)
Pin 4	Shield for UDI_Data2[+/-]	GND
Pin 5	Positive side of UDI lane 2 data	UDI_Data2+
Pin 6	Negative side of UDI lane 2 data	UDI_Data2-
Pin 7	Shield for UDI_Data1[+/-]	GND
Pin 8	Positive side of UDI lane 1 data	UDI_Data1+
Pin 9	Negative side of UDI lane 1 data	UDI_Data1-
Pin 10	Shield for UDI_Data0[+/-]	GND
Pin 11	Positive side of UDI lane 0 data	UDI_Data0+
Pin 12	Negative side of UDI lane 0 data	UDI_Data0-
Pin 13	Shield for UDI_Clk[+/-]	GND
Pin 14	Positive side of UDI differential reference clock	UDI_Clk+
Pin 15	Negative side of UDI differential reference clock	UDI_Clk-
Pin 16	Discrete ground wire	GND
Pin 17	Consumer Electronics Control (optional)	CEC
Pin 18	UDI auxiliary power	UDI_APwr
Pin 19	UDI control clock	UDI_CtrlClk
Pin 20	UDI control data	UDI_CtrlData
Pin 21	Supply voltage for control link signals	UDI_EPwr
Pin 22	UDI link hot-plug detect	UDI_HPD

Unified Display Interface (UDI) was a digital video interface specification released in 2006 which was based on Digital Visual Interface (DVI). It was intended to be a lower cost implementation while providing compatibility with existing High-Definition Multimedia Interface (HDMI) and DVI displays. Unlike HDMI, which is aimed at high-definition multimedia consumer electronics devices such as television monitors and DVD players, UDI was specifically targeted towards computer monitor and video card manufacturers and did not support the transfer of audio data. A contemporary rival standard, DisplayPort, gained significant industry support starting in 2007 and the UDI specification was abandoned shortly thereafter without having released any products.

== Development ==
On December 20, 2005, the UDI Special Interest Group (UDI SIG) was announced, along with a tentative specification called version 0.8. The group, which worked on refining the specification and promoting the interface, was led by Intel and included Apple Computer, Intel, LG, NVIDIA, Samsung, and Silicon Image Inc.

The announcement of UDI lagged the DisplayPort standard by a few months, which had been unveiled by the Video Electronics Standards Association (VESA) in May 2005. DisplayPort was being developed by a rival consortium including ATI Technologies, Samsung, NVIDIA, Dell, Hewlett-Packard, and Molex. Fundamentally, DisplayPort transmits video in packets of data, while the preceding DVI and HDMI standards transmit raw video as a digital signal; UDI took an approach closer to DVI/HDMI. The UDI specification 1.0 was finalized and released in July 2006. The differences between UDI and HDMI were kept to a minimum since both specifications were designed for long-term compatibility. Again, UDI lagged DisplayPort by a few months, which had released its finalized version 1.0 specification in May 2006.

The group changed its title in late 2006 from "special interest group" to "working group" and contemporary press coverage noted that "UDI is weak when it comes to industry support", accurately predicting the future DisplayPort/HDMI duopoly. In early 2007 Intel started supporting the rival DisplayPort standard; anonymous sources stated the licensing fees associated with HDMI and incorporation of HDCP into DisplayPort swayed Intel's support. Other vendors started to use HDMI version 1.3, and both Intel and Samsung withdrew their support from UDI. There have been no announcements made about UDI since early 2007 and the UDI website became no longer operational after 2007, and it appears the UDI standard was abandoned before products were released.

== Technical ==
There were two UDI implementations: "external profile" (for desktop computers and displays) and "embedded profile" (for the internal display of a laptop computer).

Under the external profile, data was transmitted using three differential data pairs and one differential clock pair using the TMDS encoding scheme. The external profile is considered an extension of HDMI and is backwards-compatible with HDMI Rev. 1.2 displays; however, UDI does not carry audio information as it is targeted towards high-resolution computer monitors instead. As HDMI is itself an extension of DVI with HDCP, UDI external profile is compatible with these standards as well.

The embedded profile was slightly different, using either one or three differential pairs, each of which carried both data and clock information. The embedded profile uses an ANSI 8b/10b encoding scheme instead.

UDI provided higher bandwidth than its predecessors (up to 16 Gbit/s in its first version, compared to 4.95 Gbit/s for HDMI 1.0) and incorporated a form of digital rights management known as HDCP.

=== Connector ===
The external and embedded connector implementations were electrically compatible and physically similar, each with a single row of contacts, but they had different form factors and contact counts. The "embedded" implementation was only specified for the display panel interface and had a single row of 26 contacts, while the "external" implementation had a single row of 22 contacts inside a metal shield with a physically keyed rectangular cross-section, resembling the USB Type A connectors. The contacts were spaced on a pitch of 0.6 mm (0.024 in) (external) and 1.0 mm (0.039 in) (embedded).

Three of the contacts were reserved for future upgrade possibilities. Transmit and receive plugs and receptacles were different physically, similar to peripheral cables with USB-A and USB-B on each end, requiring the UDI cable to be plugged in one way only. Bidirectional communication worked at a much lower data rate than that available for the single direction video datastream.

UDI external connector pinout
Pin	Signal	Description
1	RSVD	Reserved; second mate
2	RSVD	Reserved; second mate
3	RSVD	Reserved; second mate
4	Gnd	UDI Data2 shield; second mate
5	UDI Data2+	UDI differential data pair 2: +; second mate
6	UDI Data2-	UDI differential data pair 2: -; second mate
7	Gnd	UDI Data1 shield; second mate
8	UDI Data1+	UDI differential data pair 1: +; second mate
9	UDI Data1-	UDI differential data pair 1: -; second mate
10	Gnd	UDI Data0 shield; second mate
11	UDI Data0+	UDI differential data pair 0: +; second mate
12	UDI Data0-	UDI differential data pair 0: -; second mate
13	Gnd	UDI Clk shield; second mate
14	UDI Clk+	UDI differential reference clock: +; second mate
15	UDI Clk-	UDI differential reference clock: -; second mate
16	Gnd	Ground; discrete wire; second mate
17	CEC (Note: Only applicable for UDI to HDMI)	Consumer Electronics Control (optional); second mate
18	UDI APwr (Note: Required for both source and sink, for active adapters or repeaters)	UDI auxiliary power; second mate
19	UDI CtrlClk	UDI control clock; second mate
20	UDI CtrlData	UDI control data; second mate
21	UDI EPwr	UDI power: +5V; third mate
22	UDI HPD	UDI hot-plug detect; third mate
—	Connector shell	first mate

UDI embedded connector pinout
Pin	Signal	Description
1	VDD UDL	Supply voltage for data link circuitry
2	VDD UDL	Supply voltage for data link circuitry
3	VDD UDL	Supply voltage for data link circuitry
4	VDD UDL	Supply voltage for data link circuitry
5	VSS	Supply return for control and data link power
6	VSS	Supply return for control and data link power
7	VSS	Supply return for control and data link power
8	VSS	Supply return for control and data link power
9	UDI Data0+	UDI lane 0 data; only used for ×3 lane width
10	UDI Data0+	UDI lane 0 data; only used for ×3 lane width
11	GND	Shield for UDI Data0
12	UDI Data1+	UDI lane 1 data; used for ×1 and ×3 lane widths
13	UDI Data1-	UDI lane 1 data; used for ×1 and ×3 lane widths
14	GND	Shield for UDI Data1
15	UDI Data2+	UDI lane 2 data; only used for ×3 lane width
16	UDI Data2-	UDI lane 2 data; only used for ×3 lane width
17	GND	Shield for UDI Data2
18	RSVD	Reserved
19	RSVD	Reserved
20	RSVD	Reserved
21	(Test pin)	
22	GND	Ground return
23	UDI EPwr	Supply voltage for control link signals
24	UDI CtrlClk	UDI control link clock
25	UDI CtrlData	UDI control link data
26	UDI HPD	UDI link hot-plug detect
