= Gigabit Video Interface =

Gigabit Video Interface (GVIF) is a digital video serial interface developed by Sony in 1996 for high quality uncompressed video transmission from digital video hardware. It is intended primarily for automotive applications. It is compatible with the HDCP encryption system.

GVIF transmits uncompressed serial data at speeds up to 1.95 Gbit/s. GVIF transmits over a single differential pair; as a result, the cable is thin. Transmission distances up to ten meters are possible.

== Utilisation ==
The GVIF bus was used circa 2000 onwards on many mid-range vehicles, including the Land Rover Discovery 3, Range Rover, some Lexus models, and the Toyota Prius. GVIF was primarily used to carry the video signal between the integrated satellite navigation unit and the in-vehicle display (also known as head unit). In these vehicles, GVIF only carried video, despite the specification allowing for the transport of other information.
