= HDMI =

Digital audiovisual data interface

HDMI High-Definition Multimedia Interface

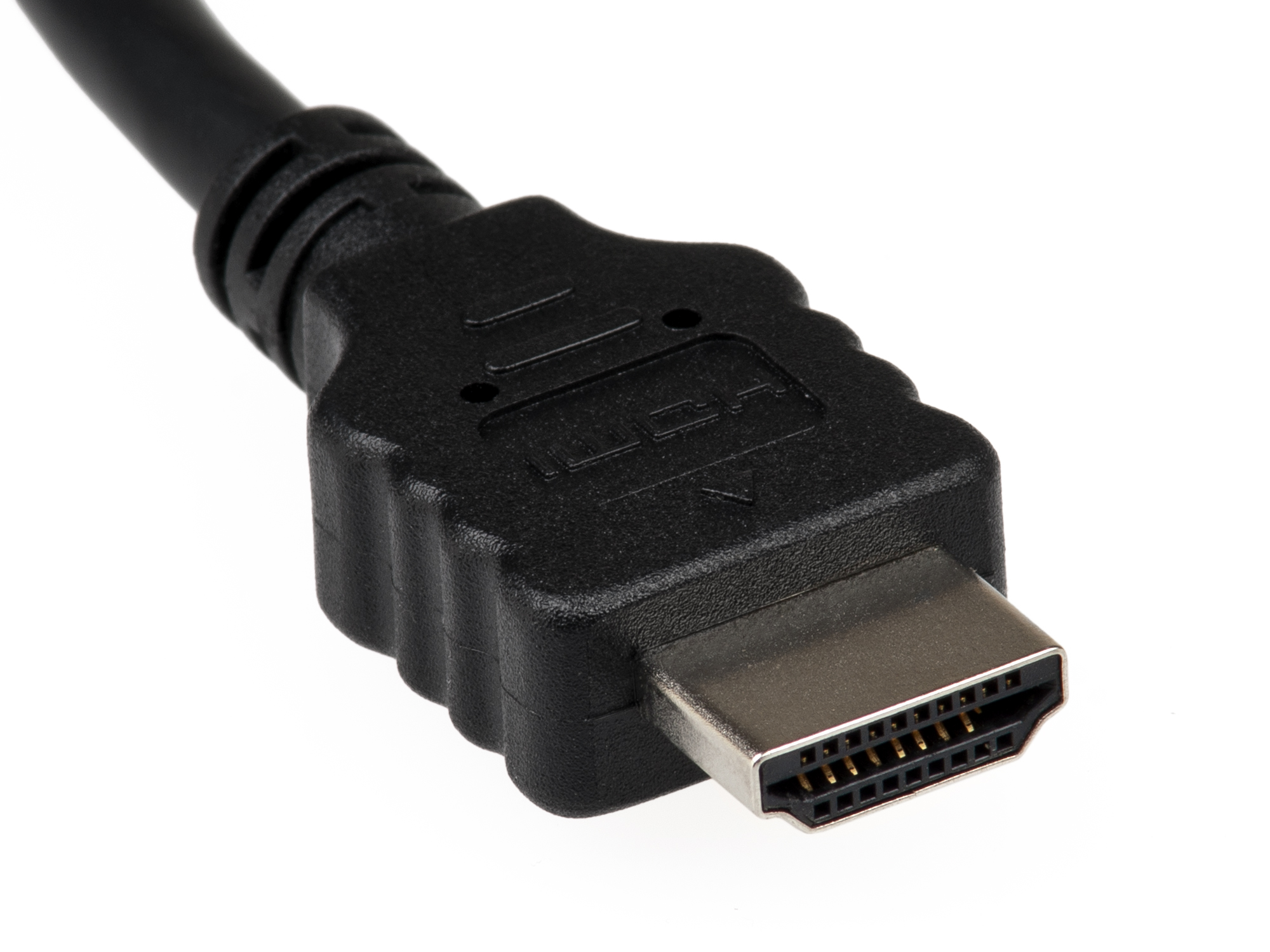
- Male HDMI "type A" connector
- Type: Digital audio/video/data connector

Production history
- Designer: HDMI Forum (Founders: Hitachi, Matsushita, Maxell, Philips, Silicon Image, Sony, Thomson and Toshiba)
- Designed: December 2002
- Superseded: RCA connector (Component, composite), SCART, S-Video, DVI and VGA
- Open standard?: No

General specifications
- Width: Type A: 13.9 mm (0.55 in); Type C: 10.42 mm (0.410 in); Type D: 6.4 mm (0.25 in)
- Height: Type A: 4.45 mm (0.175 in); Type C: 2.42 mm (0.095 in); Type D: 2.8 mm (0.11 in)
- Hot pluggable: Yes
- External: Yes
- Audio signal: Yes
- Video signal: Yes
- Pins: 19

Data
- Data signal: Yes
- Bitrate: Up to 96 Gbit/s (HDMI 2.2)
- Protocol: TMDS, Fixed Rate Link (FRL)

Pinout
- HDMI type A receptacle
- Pin 1: HDMI 1.0–2.0: TMDS data 2 (+); HDMI 2.1+: FRL data 2 (+)
- Pin 2: HDMI 1.0–2.0: TMDS data 2 ground; HDMI 2.1+: FRL data 2 ground
- Pin 3: HDMI 1.0–2.0: TMDS data 2 (−); HDMI 2.1+: FRL data 2 (−)
- Pin 4: HDMI 1.0–2.0: TMDS data 1 (+); HDMI 2.1+: FRL data 1 (+)
- Pin 5: HDMI 1.0–2.0: TMDS data 1 ground; HDMI 2.1+: FRL data 1 ground
- Pin 6: HDMI 1.0–2.0: TMDS data 1 (−); HDMI 2.1+: FRL data 1 (−)
- Pin 7: HDMI 1.0–2.0: TMDS data 0 (+); HDMI 2.1+: FRL data 0 (+)
- Pin 8: HDMI 1.0–2.0: TMDS data 0 ground; HDMI 2.1+: FRL data 0 ground
- Pin 9: HDMI 1.0–2.0: TMDS data 0 (−); HDMI 2.1+: FRL data 0 (−)
- Pin 10: HDMI 1.0–2.0: TMDS clock (+); HDMI 2.1+: FRL data 3 (+)
- Pin 11: HDMI 1.0–2.0: TMDS clock ground; HDMI 2.1+: FRL data 3 ground
- Pin 12: HDMI 1.0–2.0: TMDS clock (−); HDMI 2.1+: FRL data 3 (−)
- Pin 13: CEC
- Pin 14: HDMI 1.0–1.3a: Unused; HDMI 1.4–2.0: ARC (+) or HEC (+); HDMI 2.1+: eARC (+), ARC (+) or HEC (+)
- Pin 15: SCL (I^{2}C clock for DDC)
- Pin 16: SDA (I^{2}C data for DDC)
- Pin 17: Ground for ARC, eARC, CEC, DDC and HEC
- Pin 18: +5 V (up to 50 mA)
- Pin 19: All versions: Hot plug detect; HDMI 1.4–2.0: ARC (−) or HEC (−); HDMI 2.1+: eARC (−), ARC (−) or HEC (−)

HDMI (High-Definition Multimedia Interface) is a brand of proprietary digital interface used to transmit high-quality video and audio signals between devices. It is commonly used to connect devices such as televisions, computer monitors, projectors, gaming consoles, and personal computers. HDMI supports uncompressed video and digital audio either compressed or uncompressed, allowing a single cable to carry all audiovisual signals.

Introduced in 2003, HDMI largely replaced older analog video standards such as composite video, S-Video, and VGA in consumer electronics. It was developed based on the CEA-861 standard, which was also used with the earlier Digital Visual Interface (DVI). HDMI is electrically compatible with DVI video signals, and adapters allow interoperability between the two without signal conversion or loss of quality. Adapters and active converters are also available for connecting HDMI to other video interfaces, including the older analog formats, as well as digital formats such as DisplayPort.

HDMI has gone through multiple revisions since its introduction, with each version adding new features while maintaining backward compatibility. In addition to transmitting audio and video, HDMI also supports data transmission for features such as Consumer Electronics Control (CEC), which allows devices to control each other through a single remote, and the HDMI Ethernet Channel (HEC), which enables network connectivity between compatible devices. It also supports the Display Data Channel (DDC), used for automatic configuration between source devices and displays. Newer versions include advanced capabilities such as 3D video, higher resolutions, and expanded color spaces. The Audio Return Channel (ARC) and Enhanced Audio Return Channel (eARC) allow audio to be sent from a display back to an audio system over the same HDMI cable. Smaller connector types, Mini and Micro HDMI, were also introduced for use with compact devices like camcorders and tablets.

As of January 2026, nearly 14 billion HDMI-enabled devices have been sold worldwide, making it one of the most widely adopted audio/video interfaces in consumer electronics.

== History ==
The HDMI founders were Hitachi, Panasonic, Sanyo (as a Panasonic affiliate), Philips, Silicon Image (now Lattice Semiconductor), Sony, Thomson (now Vantiva), and Toshiba. Intel contributed the HDCP copy protection system. The new format won the support of motion picture studios Fox, Universal, Warner Bros. and Disney, along with content distributors DirecTV, EchoStar (Dish Network) and CableLabs.

The HDMI founders began development on HDMI 1.0 on April 16, 2002, with the goal of creating an AV connector that was backward-compatible with DVI. At the time, DVI-HDCP (DVI with HDCP) and DVI-HDTV (DVI-HDCP using the CEA-861-B video standard) were being used on HDTVs. HDMI 1.0 was designed to improve on DVI-HDTV by using a smaller connector and adding audio capability, enhanced Y′C_{B}C_{R} capability, and consumer electronics control functions.

The first Authorized Testing Center (ATC), which tests HDMI products, was opened by Silicon Image on June 23, 2003, in California, United States. The first ATC in Japan was opened by Panasonic on May 1, 2004, in Osaka. The first ATC in Europe was opened by Philips on May 25, 2005, in Caen, France. The first ATC in China was opened by Silicon Image on November 21, 2005, in Shenzhen. The first ATC in India was opened by Philips on June 12, 2008, in Bangalore. The HDMI website contains a list of all the ATCs.

According to In-Stat, the number of HDMI devices sold was 5 million in 2004, 17.4 million in 2005, 63 million in 2006, and 143 million in 2007. HDMI has become the de facto standard for HDTVs, and according to In-Stat, around 90% of digital televisions in 2007 included HDMI. In-Stat has estimated that 229 million HDMI devices were sold in 2008. On April 8, 2008, there were over 850 consumer electronics and PC companies that had adopted the HDMI specification (HDMI adopters). On January 7, 2009, HDMI Licensing, LLC announced that HDMI had reached an installed base of over 600 million HDMI devices. In-Stat estimated that 394 million HDMI devices would sell in 2009 and that all digital televisions by the end of 2009 would have at least one HDMI input.

On January 28, 2008, In-Stat reported that shipments of HDMI were expected to exceed those of DVI in 2008, driven primarily by the consumer electronics market.

In 2008, PC Magazine awarded a Technical Excellence Award in the Home Theater category for an "innovation that has changed the world" to the CEC portion of the HDMI specification. Ten companies were given a Technology and Engineering Emmy Award for their development of HDMI by the National Academy of Television Arts and Sciences on January 7, 2009.

On October 25, 2011, the HDMI Forum was established by the HDMI founders. Also on the same day HDMI Licensing, LLC announced that there were over 1,100 HDMI adopters and that more than 2 billion HDMI-enabled products had shipped since the launch of the HDMI standard.

On January 8, 2013, HDMI Licensing, LLC announced that there were over 1,300 HDMI adopters and that over 3 billion HDMI devices had shipped since the launch of the HDMI standard. The day also marked the 10th anniversary of the release of the first HDMI specification.

As of January 2021, nearly 10 billion HDMI devices had been sold.

== Specifications ==
The HDMI specification defines the protocols, signals, electrical interfaces and mechanical requirements of the standard. The maximum pixel clock rate for HDMI 1.0 is 165 MHz, which is sufficient to allow 1080p and WUXGA (1920×1200) at 60 Hz. HDMI 1.3 increases that to 340 MHz, which allows for higher resolution (such as WQXGA, 2560×1600) across a single digital link. An HDMI connection can either be single-link (type A/C/D) or dual-link (type B) and can have a video pixel rate of 25 MHz to 340 MHz (for a single-link connection) or 25 MHz to 680 MHz (for a dual-link connection). Video formats with pixel rates below 25 MHz (like 480i at 13.5 MHz) are transmitted over TMDS links using a pixel-repetition scheme.

=== Audio/video ===
HDMI uses the Consumer Technology Association/Electronic Industries Alliance 861 standards. HDMI 1.0 to HDMI 1.2a uses the EIA/CEA-861-B video standard, HDMI 1.3 uses the CEA-861-D video standard, and HDMI 1.4 uses the CEA-861-E video standard. The CEA-861-E document defines "video formats and waveforms; colorimetry and quantization; transport of compressed and uncompressed LPCM audio; carriage of auxiliary data; and implementations of the Video Electronics Standards Association (VESA) Enhanced Extended Display Identification Data Standard (E-EDID)". On July 15, 2013, the CEA announced the publication of CEA-861-F, a standard that can be used by video interfaces such as DVI, HDMI, and LVDS. CEA-861-F adds the ability to transmit several Ultra HD video formats and additional color spaces.

To ensure baseline compatibility between different HDMI sources and displays (as well as backward compatibility with the electrically compatible DVI standard) all HDMI devices must implement the sRGB color space at 8 bits per component. Ability to use the Y′C_{B}C_{R} color space and higher color depths ("deep color") is optional. HDMI permits sRGB 4:4:4 chroma sampling (8–16 bits per component), xvYCC 4:4:4 chroma sampling (8–16 bits per component), Y′C_{B}C_{R} 4:4:4 chroma sampling (8–16 bits per component), or Y′C_{B}C_{R} 4:2:2 chroma subsampling (8–12 bits per component). The color spaces that can be used by HDMI are ITU-R BT.601, ITU-R BT.709-5 and IEC 61966-2-4.

For digital audio, if an HDMI device has audio, it is required to implement the baseline format: stereo (uncompressed) PCM. Other formats are optional, with HDMI allowing up to 8 channels of uncompressed audio at sample sizes of 16 bits, 20 bits, or 24 bits, with sample rates of 32 kHz, 44.1 kHz, 48 kHz, 88.2 kHz, 96 kHz, 176.4 kHz, or 192 kHz. HDMI also carries any IEC 61937-compliant compressed audio stream, such as Dolby Digital and DTS, and up to 8 channels of one-bit DSD audio (used on Super Audio CDs) at rates up to four times that of Super Audio CD. With version 1.3, HDMI allows lossless compressed audio streams Dolby TrueHD and DTS-HD Master Audio. As with the Y′C_{B}C_{R} video, audio capability is optional. With version 1.4, HDMI allows spatial audio streams Dolby Atmos and DTS:X. Audio return channel (ARC) is a feature introduced in the HDMI 1.4 standard. "Return" refers to the case where the audio comes from the TV and can be sent "upstream" to the AV receiver using the HDMI cable connected to the AV receiver. An example given on the HDMI website is that a TV that directly receives a terrestrial/satellite broadcast, or has a video source built in, sends the audio "upstream" to the AV receiver. Enhanced audio return channel (eARC) is a feature introduced in the HDMI 2.1 standard. HDMI audio applies Audio Clock Regeneration (ACR) to improve signal integrity of audio, except HDMI ARC and HDMI eARC.

The HDMI standard was not designed to pass closed caption data (for example, subtitles) to the television for decoding. As such, any closed caption stream must be decoded and included as an image in the video stream(s) prior to transmission over an HDMI cable to appear on the DTV. This limits the caption style (even for digital captions) to only that decoded at the source prior to HDMI transmission. This also prevents closed captions when transmission over HDMI is required for upconversion. For example, a DVD player that sends an upscaled 720p/1080i format via HDMI to an HDTV has no way to pass Closed Captioning data so that the HDTV can decode it, as there is no line 21 VBI in that format.

=== Communication channels ===
HDMI has three physically separate communication channels, which are the VESA DDC, TMDS and the optional CEC. HDMI 1.4 added ARC and HEC.

==== Display Data Channel (DDC) ====
The Display Data Channel (DDC) is a VESA standard communications channel based on the I^{2}C bus specification. HDMI specifically requires the device implement the Enhanced Display Data Channel (E-DDC), which is used by the HDMI source device to read the E-EDID data from the HDMI sink device to learn what audio/video formats it can take. HDMI requires that the E-DDC implement I^{2}C standard mode speed (100 kbit/s) and allows it to optionally implement fast mode speed (400 kbit/s).

I^{2}C address 0x74 on the DDC channel is actively used for High-bandwidth Digital Content Protection (HDCP).

==== Transition-minimized differential signaling (TMDS) ====
Transition-minimized differential signaling (TMDS) on HDMI interleaves video, audio and auxiliary data using three different packet types, called the video data period, the data island period and the control period. During the video data period, the pixels of an active video line are transmitted. During the data island period (which occurs during the horizontal and vertical blanking intervals), audio and auxiliary data are transmitted within a series of packets. The control period occurs between video and data island periods.

Both HDMI and DVI use TMDS to send 10-bit characters that are encoded using 8b/10b encoding that differs from the original IBM form for the video data period and 2b/10b encoding for the control period. HDMI adds the ability to send audio and auxiliary data using 4b/10b encoding for the data island period. Each data island period is 32 pixels in size and contains a 32-bit packet header, which includes 8 bits of BCH ECC parity data for error correction and describes the contents of the packet. Each packet contains four subpackets, and each subpacket is 64 bits in size, including 8 bits of BCH ECC parity data, allowing for each packet to carry up to 224 bits of audio data. Each data island period can contain up to 18 packets. Seven of the 15 packet types described in the HDMI 1.3a specifications deal with audio data, while the other 8 types deal with auxiliary data. Among these are the general control packet and the gamut metadata packet. The general control packet carries information on AVMUTE (which mutes the audio during changes that may cause audio noise) and color depth (which sends the bit depth of the current video stream and is required for deep color). The gamut metadata packet carries information on the color space being used for the current video stream and is required for xvYCC.

==== Consumer Electronics Control (CEC) ====
Consumer Electronics Control (CEC) is an HDMI feature designed to allow the user to command and control up to 15 CEC-enabled devices, that are connected through HDMI, by using only one of their remote controls (for example by controlling a television set, set-top box, and DVD player using only the remote control of the TV). CEC also allows for individual CEC-enabled devices to command and control each other without user intervention.

It is a one-wire bidirectional serial bus that is based on the CENELEC standard AV.link protocol to perform remote control functions. CEC wiring is mandatory, although implementation of CEC in a product is optional. It was defined in HDMI Specification 1.0 and updated in HDMI 1.2, HDMI 1.2a and HDMI 1.3a (which added timer and audio commands to the bus). USB to CEC adapters exist that allow a computer to control CEC-enabled devices.

=== Fixed Rate Link (FRL) ===
Fixed Rate Link (FRL) is a signaling technology introduced in HDMI 2.1 to support higher data rates than those available with Transition-Minimized Differential Signaling (TMDS). Unlike TMDS, which uses three data lanes and a separate clock lane, FRL uses four data lanes with an embedded clock. HDMI 2.1 FRL employs 16b/18b line encoding and supports an aggregate transmission rate of up to 48 Gbit/s.

The HDMI 2.2 specification introduces next-generation FRL technology supporting transmission rates of up to 96 Gbit/s. The specification retains TMDS support for backward compatibility with earlier HDMI devices.

==== HDMI Ethernet and Audio Return Channel ====
Introduced in HDMI 1.4, HDMI Ethernet and Audio Return Channel (HEAC) adds a high-speed bidirectional data communication link (HEC) and the ability to send audio data upstream to the source device (ARC). HEAC utilizes two lines from the connector: the previously unused Reserved pin (called HEAC+) and the Hot Plug Detect pin (called HEAC−). If only ARC transmission is required, a single mode signal using the HEAC+ line can be used, otherwise, HEC is transmitted as a differential signal over the pair of lines, and ARC as a common mode component of the pair.

===== Audio Return Channel (ARC) and Enhanced Audio Return Channel (eARC) =====
ARC (Audio Return Channel) is an audio link introduced in 2009 with the HDMI 1.4 standard meant to replace other cables between the TV and the A/V receiver or speaker system. This direction is used when the TV is the one that generates or receives the video stream instead of the other equipment (such as game console or DVD player). A typical case is the running of an app on a smart TV such as Netflix, but reproduction of audio is handled by the other equipment. Without ARC, the audio output from the TV must be routed by another cable, typically TOSLink or RCA, into the speaker system. ARC supports stereo PCM, and compressed codecs Dolby Digital, Dolby Digital Plus, and DTS, up to 5.1 channels, with Dolby Atmos metadata in Dolby codecs.

eARC (Enhanced Audio Return Channel) was introduced in 2017 with the HDMI 2.1 standard. eARC has higher bandwidth (37 Mbps) and adds support for uncompressed (PCM) 5.1 or 7.1 surround sound, Dolby TrueHD and DTS-HD Master Audio passthrough with support for up to 32 channels. eARC requires an "Ultra High Speed", "Premium High Speed with Ethernet", or "High Speed with Ethernet" HDMI cable.

===== HDMI Ethernet Channel (HEC) =====
HDMI Ethernet Channel technology consolidates video, audio, and data streams into a single HDMI cable, and the HEC feature enables IP-based applications over HDMI and provides a bidirectional Ethernet communication at 100 Mbit/s. The physical layer of the Ethernet implementation uses a hybrid to simultaneously send and receive attenuated 100BASE-TX-type signals through a single twisted pair.

=== Compatibility with DVI ===
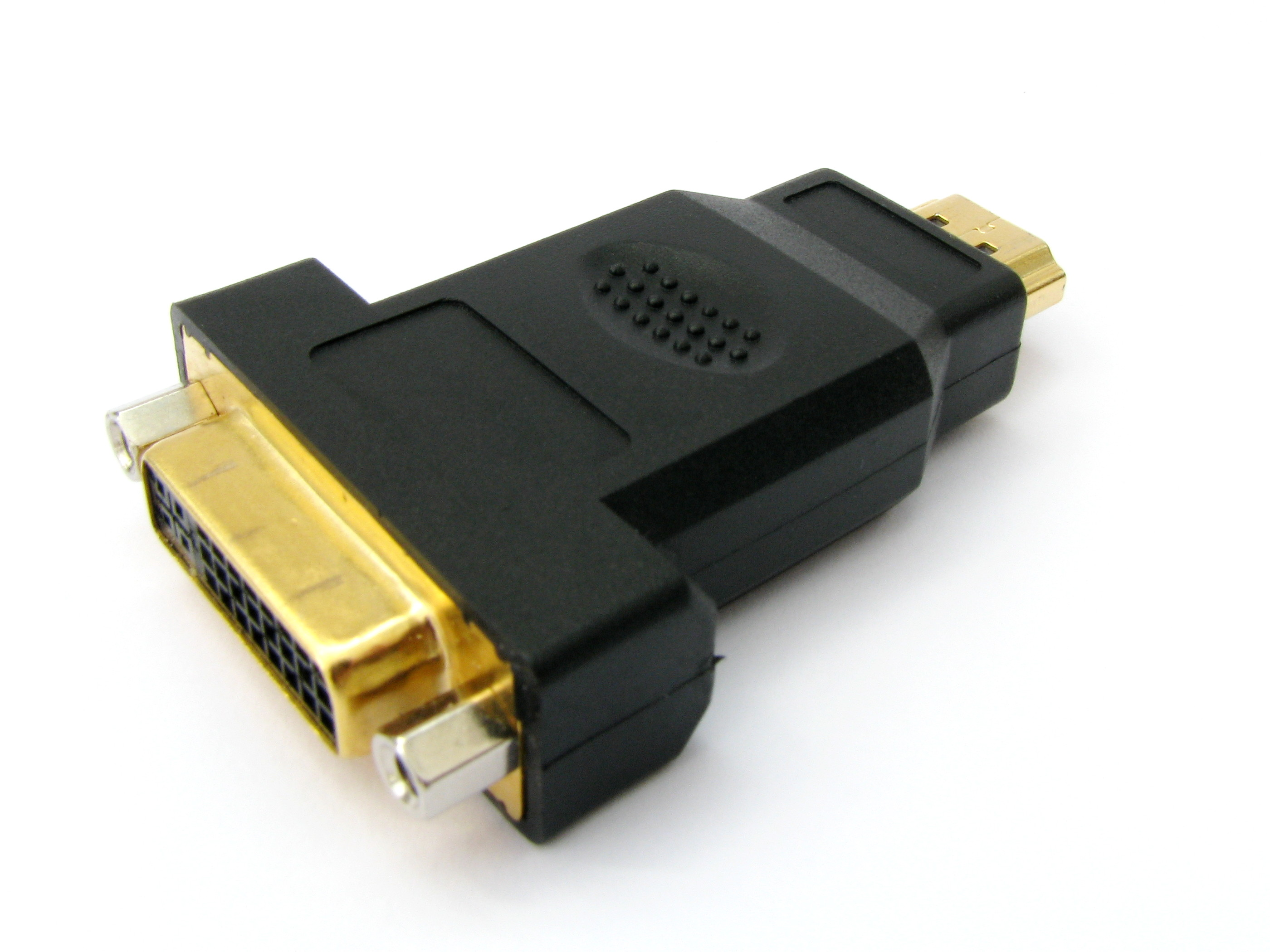
An adapter with HDMI (male, right) and DVI (female, left) connectors

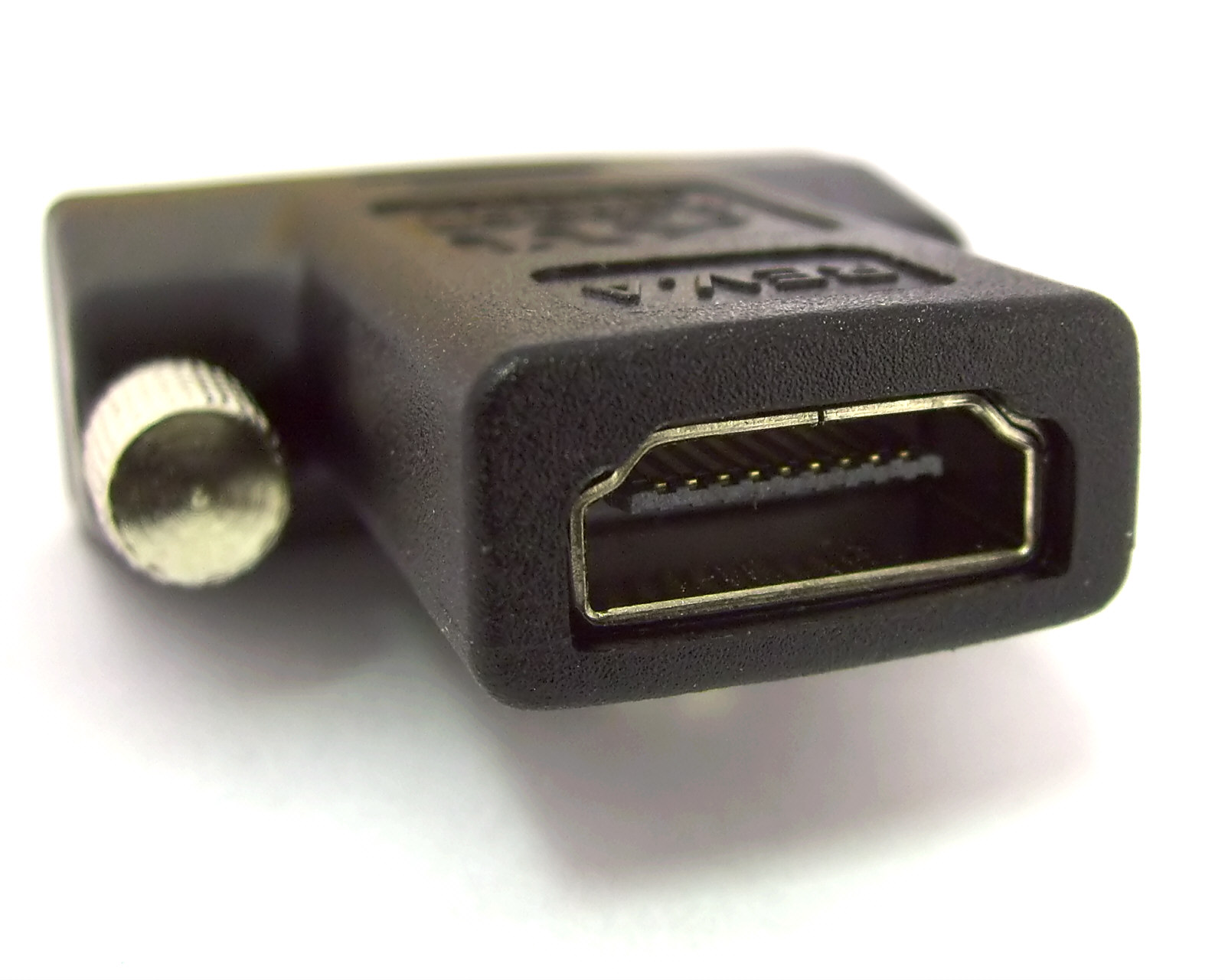
An adapter with DVI (male, rear, not visible) and HDMI (female, front) connectors

HDMI is backward compatible with single-link Digital Visual Interface digital video (DVI-D or DVI-I, but not DVI-A or dual-link DVI). No signal conversion is required when an adapter or asymmetric cable is used, so there is no loss of video quality.

From a user's perspective, an HDMI display can be driven by a single-link DVI-D source, since HDMI and DVI-D define an overlapping minimum set of allowed resolutions and frame-buffer formats to ensure a basic level of interoperability. In the reverse case, a DVI-D monitor has the same level of basic interoperability unless content protection with High-bandwidth Digital Content Protection (HDCP) interferes—or the HDMI color encoding is in component color space Y′C_{B}C_{R} instead of RGB, which is not possible in DVI. An HDMI source, such as a Blu-ray player, may require an HDCP-compliant display, and refuse to output HDCP-protected content to a non-compliant display. A further complication is that there is a small amount of display equipment, such as some high-end home theater projectors, designed with HDMI inputs but not HDCP-compliant.

Any DVI-to-HDMI adapter can function as an HDMI-to-DVI adapter (and vice versa). Typically, the only limitation is the gender of the adapter's connectors and the gender of the cables and sockets it is used with.

Features specific to HDMI, such as remote-control and audio transport, are not available in devices that use legacy DVI-D signalling. However, many devices output HDMI over a DVI connector (e.g., ATI HD 2000-series and Nvidia GTX 200-series video cards), and some multimedia displays may accept HDMI (including audio) over a DVI input. Exact capabilities beyond basic compatibility vary. Adapters are generally bi-directional.

=== Content protection (HDCP) ===
High-bandwidth Digital Content Protection (HDCP) is a newer form of digital rights management (DRM). Intel created the original technology to make sure that digital content followed the guidelines set by the Digital Content Protection group.

HDMI can use HDCP to encrypt the signal if required by the source device. Content Scramble System (CSS), Content Protection for Recordable Media (CPRM) and Advanced Access Content System (AACS) require the use of HDCP on HDMI when playing back encrypted DVD Video, DVD Audio, HD DVD and Blu-ray Discs. The HDCP repeater bit controls the authentication and switching/distribution of an HDMI signal. According to HDCP Specification 1.2 (beginning with HDMI CTS 1.3a), any system that implements HDCP must do so in a fully compliant manner. HDCP testing that was previously only a requirement for optional tests such as the "Simplay HD" testing program is now part of the requirements for HDMI compliance. HDCP accommodates up to 127 connected devices with up to 7 levels, using a combination of sources, sinks and repeaters. A simple example of this is several HDMI devices connected to an HDMI AV receiver that is connected to an HDMI display.

Devices called HDCP strippers can remove the HDCP information from the video signal so the video can play on non-HDCP-compliant displays, though a fair use and non-disclosure form must usually be signed with a registering agency before use.

=== Connectors ===
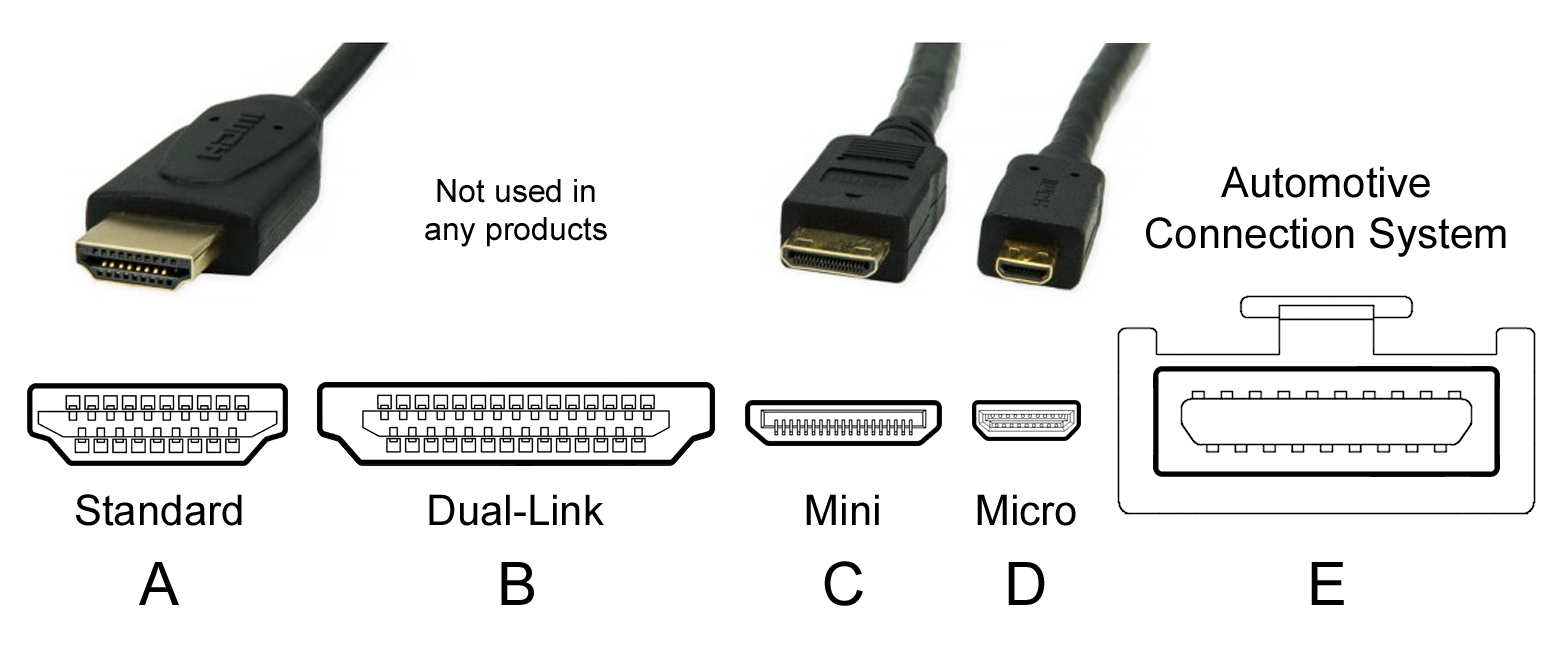
Connector types for HDMI

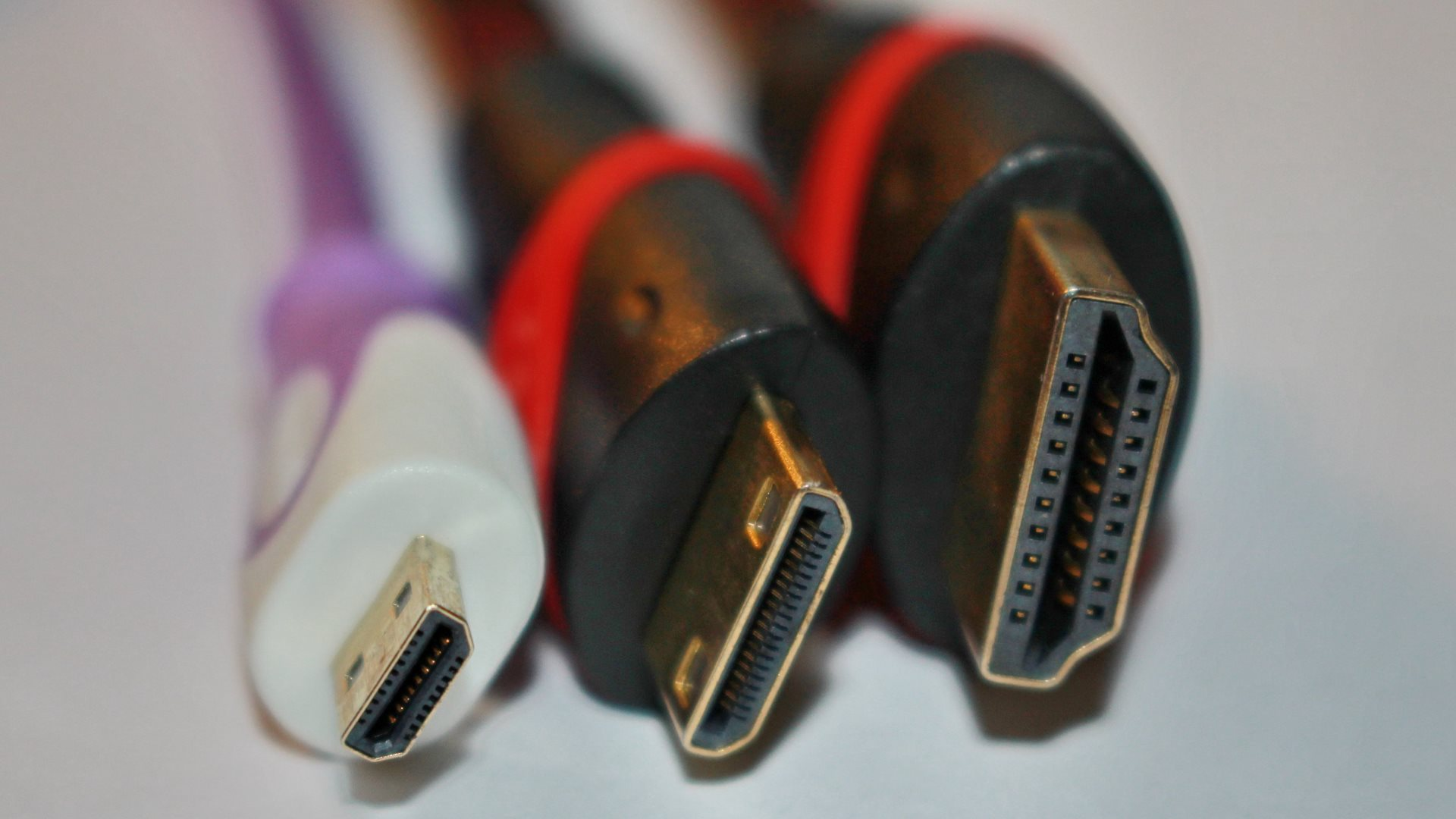
HDMI connector plugs (male): type D (Micro), type C (Mini), and type A

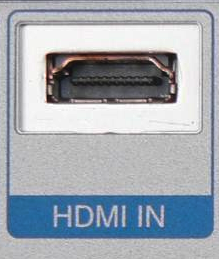
HDMI type A receptacle

There are five HDMI connector types. Type A/B are defined in the HDMI 1.0 specification, type C is defined in the HDMI 1.3 specification, and type D/E are defined in the HDMI 1.4 specification.

Type A; Standard
The plug (male) connector outside dimensions are 13.9 mm × 4.45 mm, and the receptacle (female) connector inside dimensions are 14 mm × 4.55 mm. There are 19 pins, with bandwidth to carry all SDTV, EDTV, HDTV, UHD, and 4K modes. It is electrically compatible with single-link DVI-D.
Type B; Dual-link
This connector is 21.2 mm × 4.45 mm and has 29 pins, carrying six differential pairs instead of three, for use with very high-resolution displays such as WQUXGA (3840×2400). It is electrically compatible with dual-link DVI-D. With the introduction of HDMI 1.3, the maximum bandwidth of single-link HDMI exceeded that of dual-link DVI-D. As of HDMI 1.4, the pixel clock rate crossover frequency from single to dual-link has not been defined.
Type C; Mini
This Mini connector is smaller than the type A plug, measuring 10.42 mm × 2.42 mm but has the same 19-pin configuration. It is intended for portable devices. The differences are that all positive signals of the differential pairs are swapped with their corresponding shield, the DDC/CEC Ground is assigned to pin 13 instead of pin 17, the CEC is assigned to pin 14 instead of pin 13, and the reserved pin is 17 instead of pin 14. The type C Mini connector can be connected to a type A connector using a type A-to-type C cable.
Type D; Micro

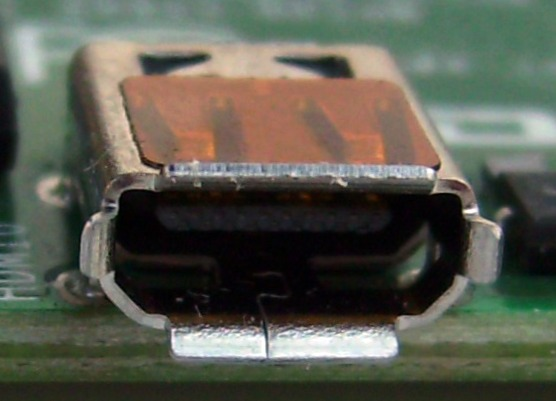
Micro HDMI receptacle

This Micro connector shrinks the connector size to something resembling a micro-USB connector, measuring only 5.83 mm × 2.20 mm For comparison, a micro-USB connector is 6.85 mm × 1.8 mm and a USB type-A connector is 11.5 mm × 4.5 mm. It keeps the standard 19 pins of types A and C, but the pin assignment is different from both.
Type E; Automotive
The Automotive Connection System has a locking tab to keep the cable from vibrating loose and a shell to help prevent moisture and dirt from corroding the pins.

The HDMI alternate mode lets a user connect the reversible USB-C connector with the HDMI source devices (mobile, tablet, laptop). This cable connects to video display/sink devices using any of the native HDMI connectors. This is an HDMI cable, in this case a USB-C to HDMI cable.

=== Cables ===
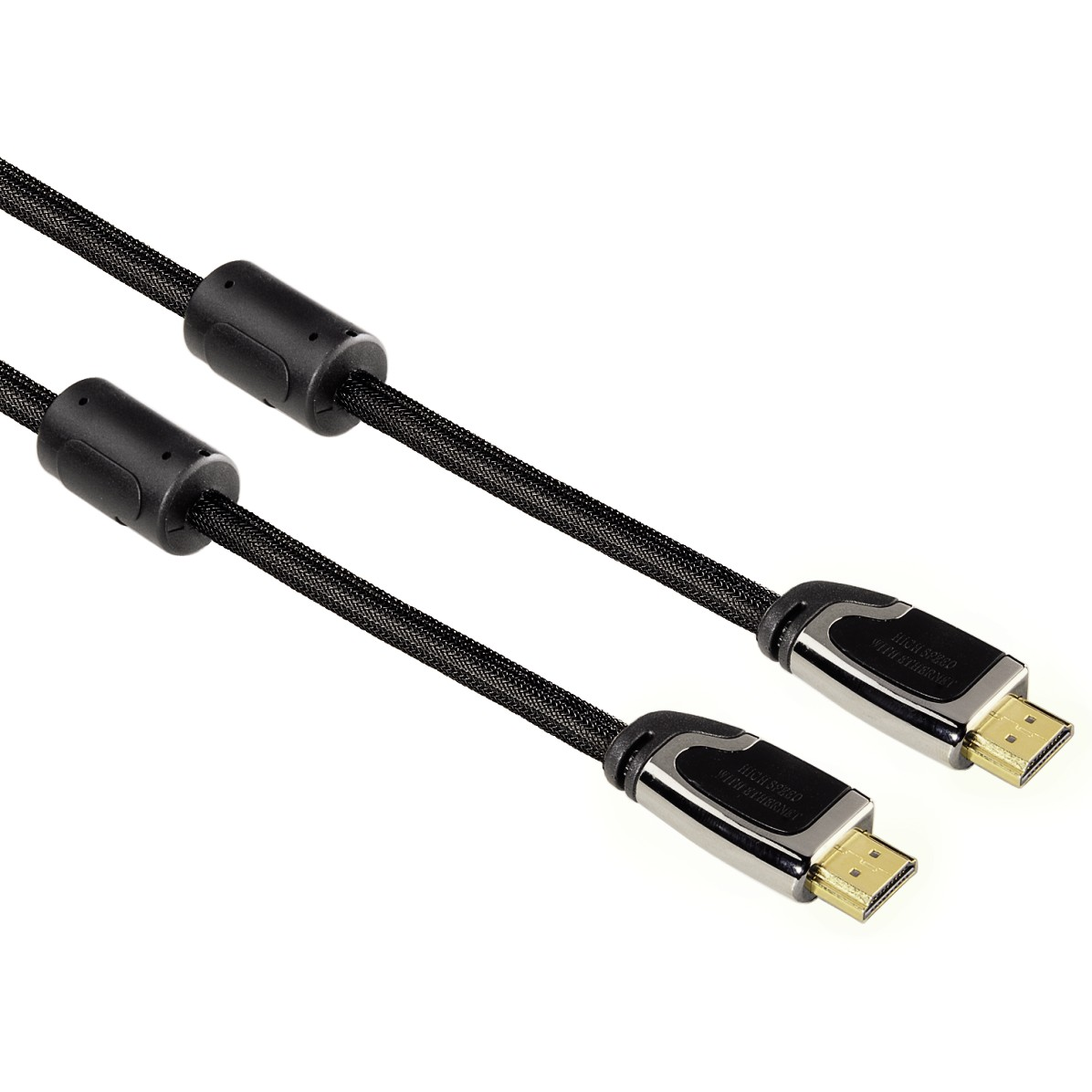
A standard HDMI cable

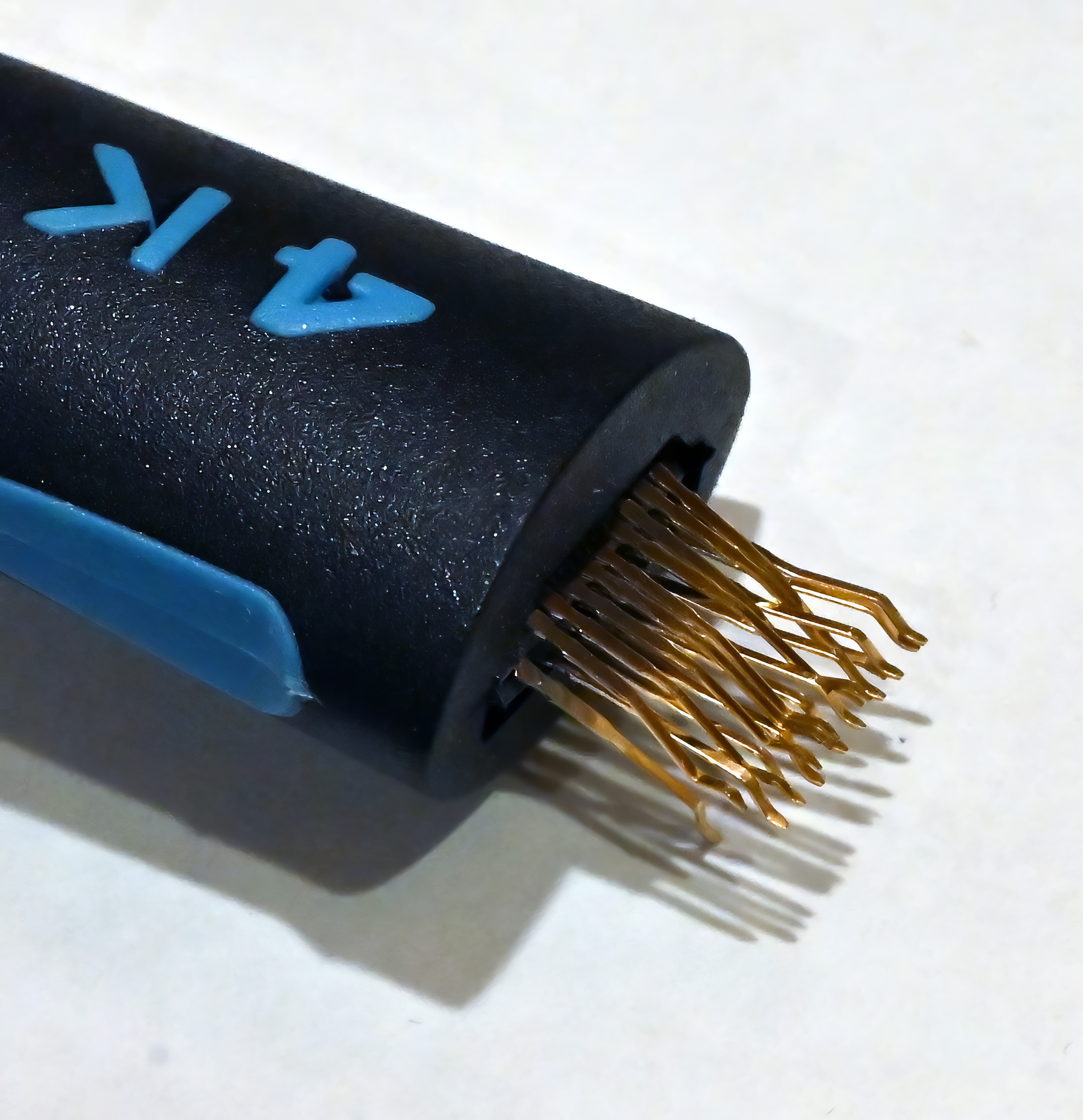
HDMI pins in connector exposed

An HDMI cable is composed of four shielded twisted pairs, with a characteristic impedance of 100 Ω (±15%), plus seven separate conductors. HDMI cables with Ethernet differ in that three of the separate conductors instead form an additional shielded twisted pair (with the CEC/DDC ground as a shield).

Although no maximum length for an HDMI cable is specified, signal attenuation (dependent on the cable's construction quality and conducting materials) limits usable lengths in practice and certification is difficult to achieve for lengths beyond 13 m. HDMI 1.3 defines two cable categories: Category 1-certified cables, which have been tested at 74.25 MHz (which would include resolutions such as 720p60 and 1080i60), and Category 2-certified cables, which have been tested at 340 MHz (which would include resolutions such as 1080p60 and 4K30). Category 1 HDMI cables are marketed as "Standard" and Category 2 HDMI cables as "High Speed". This labeling guideline for HDMI cables went into effect on October 17, 2008. Category 1 and 2 cables can either meet the required parameter specifications for inter-pair skew, far-end crosstalk, attenuation and differential impedance, or they can meet the required non-equalized/equalized eye diagram requirements. A cable of about 5 meters (16 feet) can be manufactured to Category 1 specifications easily and inexpensively by using 28 AWG (0.081 mm²) conductors. With better quality construction and materials, including 24 AWG (0.205 mm²) conductors, an HDMI cable can reach lengths of up to 15 m (49 ft). Many HDMI cables under 5 meters in length that were made before the HDMI 1.3 specification can work as Category 2 cables, but only Category 2-tested cables are guaranteed to work for Category 2 purposes.

HDMI cables are certified to guarantee a certain level of performance at an Authorized Testing Center (ATC). As of the HDMI 2.2 specification, the following certifications are defined for HDMI cables in consumer applications:

HDMI cable certifications
Certification name	Guaranteed bit rate	Description
Standard HDMI Cable	2.2275 Gbit/s	Tested up to 74.25 MHz TMDS (approximately 1280 × 720 at 60 Hz or 1920 × 1080 at 30 Hz). The ARC and inline Ethernet features require the "with Ethernet" type.
Standard HDMI Cable with Ethernet	2.2275 Gbit/s	Tested up to 74.25 MHz TMDS (approximately 1280 × 720 at 60 Hz or 1920 × 1080 at 30 Hz). The ARC and inline Ethernet features require the "with Ethernet" type.
High Speed HDMI Cable	10.2 Gbit/s	Tested up to 340 MHz TMDS (approximately 1920 × 1080 at 144 Hz or 2560 × 1440 at 75 Hz). The ARC and inline Ethernet features require the "with Ethernet" type.
High Speed HDMI Cable with Ethernet	10.2 Gbit/s	Tested up to 340 MHz TMDS (approximately 1920 × 1080 at 144 Hz or 2560 × 1440 at 75 Hz). The ARC and inline Ethernet features require the "with Ethernet" type.
Premium High Speed HDMI cable	18.0 Gbit/s	Tested up to 600 MHz TMDS (approximately 1920 × 1080 at 240 Hz, 2560 × 1440 at 144 Hz, or 3840 × 2160 at 60 Hz). The ARC and inline Ethernet features require the "with Ethernet" type.
Premium High Speed HDMI Cable with Ethernet	18.0 Gbit/s	Tested up to 600 MHz TMDS (approximately 1920 × 1080 at 240 Hz, 2560 × 1440 at 144 Hz, or 3840 × 2160 at 60 Hz). The ARC and inline Ethernet features require the "with Ethernet" type.
Ultra High Speed HDMI cable	48.0 Gbit/s	Tested at FRL 48 Gbit/s (approximately 3840 × 2160 at 144 Hz with HDR).
Ultra96 HDMI cable	96.0 Gbit/s	Tested at FRL 96 Gbit/s (approximately 3840 × 2160 at 288 Hz with HDR).

Separate certifications also exist for "automotive" Standard and High Speed HDMI cables, which use a different connector with a latching mechanism.

=== Extenders ===
Long cables can cause instability of HDCP and blinking on the screen due to the weakened DDC signal that HDCP requires. An extender can be used to address this instability. An HDMI extender is a single device (or pair of devices) powered with an external power source or from the 5 VDC from the HDMI source.

- Standard HDMI cables
  - Active HDMI cables use electronics within the cable to boost the signal and allow for HDMI cables of up to 30 meters (98 feet).
  - Several companies offer amplifiers, equalizers, and repeaters that can string several standard HDMI cables together.
- Ethernet cables (Category 5/Category 6 cable)
  - A single cable provides 4 differential pairs. As a result, with extenders based on a single cable, HDCP DDC signals must be multiplexed with TMDS video signals. There is a standard for AV over single-Ethernet-cable, HDBaseT, which is used by some extenders as the on-wire format. HDBaseT has a maximum reach of 100 meters.
  - HDMI extenders that are based on dual Category 5/Category 6 cable can extend HDMI to 250 meters (820 feet).
- Optical fiber: extenders based on optical fiber can extend HDMI to 300 meters (980 feet).
- AV-over-IP
  - SDVoE is a libre protocol-suite for transferring real-time multimedia (video, audio, etc.) over an IP data network, via IP multicasting. Several manufacturers sell transmitters/receivers with HDMI ports. The nature of data networks means that there's no inherent limit on the achievable transmission range, and the underlying physical medium (copper, fibre, radio) is abstracted away. Transferring HD video requires high network capacity of 10Gbps. Transmitters and receivers are associated via control software, enabling versatile configurable AV-distribution; 1-to-1, 1-to-many, many-to-1.

=== HDMI passthrough ===
HDMI passthrough allows HDMI devices such as soundbars and AVRs to split audio and video signals.

=== Licensing ===
The HDMI specification is not an open standard; manufacturers need to be licensed by HDMI LA in order to implement HDMI in any product or component. Companies that are licensed by HDMI LA are known as HDMI Adopters.

==== HDMI adopters ====
While earlier versions of HDMI specs are available to the public for download, only adopters have access to the latest standards (HDMI 1.4b/2.1). Only adopters have access to the compliance test specification (CTS) that is used for compliance and certification. Compliance testing is required before any HDMI product can be legally sold.

- Adopters have IP rights under Adopter Agreement.
- Adopters receive the right to use HDMI logos and trademarks on their products and marketing materials.
- Adopters are listed on the HDMI website.
- Products from adopters are listed and marketed in the official HDMI product finder database.
- Adopters receive more exposure through combined marketing, such as the annual HDMI Developers Conference and technology seminars.

==== HDMI fee structure ====
There are two annual fee structures associated with being an HDMI adopter:

- High-volume (more than 10,000 units) HDMI Adopter Agreement – US$10,000 per year.
- Low-volume (10,000 units or fewer) HDMI Adopter Agreement – US$5,000 plus a flat US$1 per unit administration fee.

The annual fee is due upon the execution of the Adopter Agreement, and must be paid on the anniversary of this date each year thereafter.

The royalty fee structure is the same for all volumes. The following variable per-unit royalty is device-based and not dependent on number of ports, chips or connectors:

- US$0.15 – for each end-user licensed product
- US$0.05 – if the HDMI logo is used on the product and promotional material, the per-unit fee drops from US$0.15 to US$0.05.
- US$0.04 – if HDCP is implemented and HDMI logo is used, the per-unit fee drops from US$0.05 to US$0.04.

Use of HDMI logo requires compliance testing. Adopters need to license HDCP separately.

The HDMI royalty is only payable on licensed products that will be sold on a stand-alone basis (i.e., that are not incorporated into another licensed product that is subject to an HDMI royalty). For example, if a cable or IC is sold to an adopter who then includes it in a television subject to a royalty, then the cable or IC maker would not pay a royalty, and the television manufacturer would pay the royalty on the final product. If the cable is sold directly to consumers, then the cable would be subject to a royalty.

== Versions ==
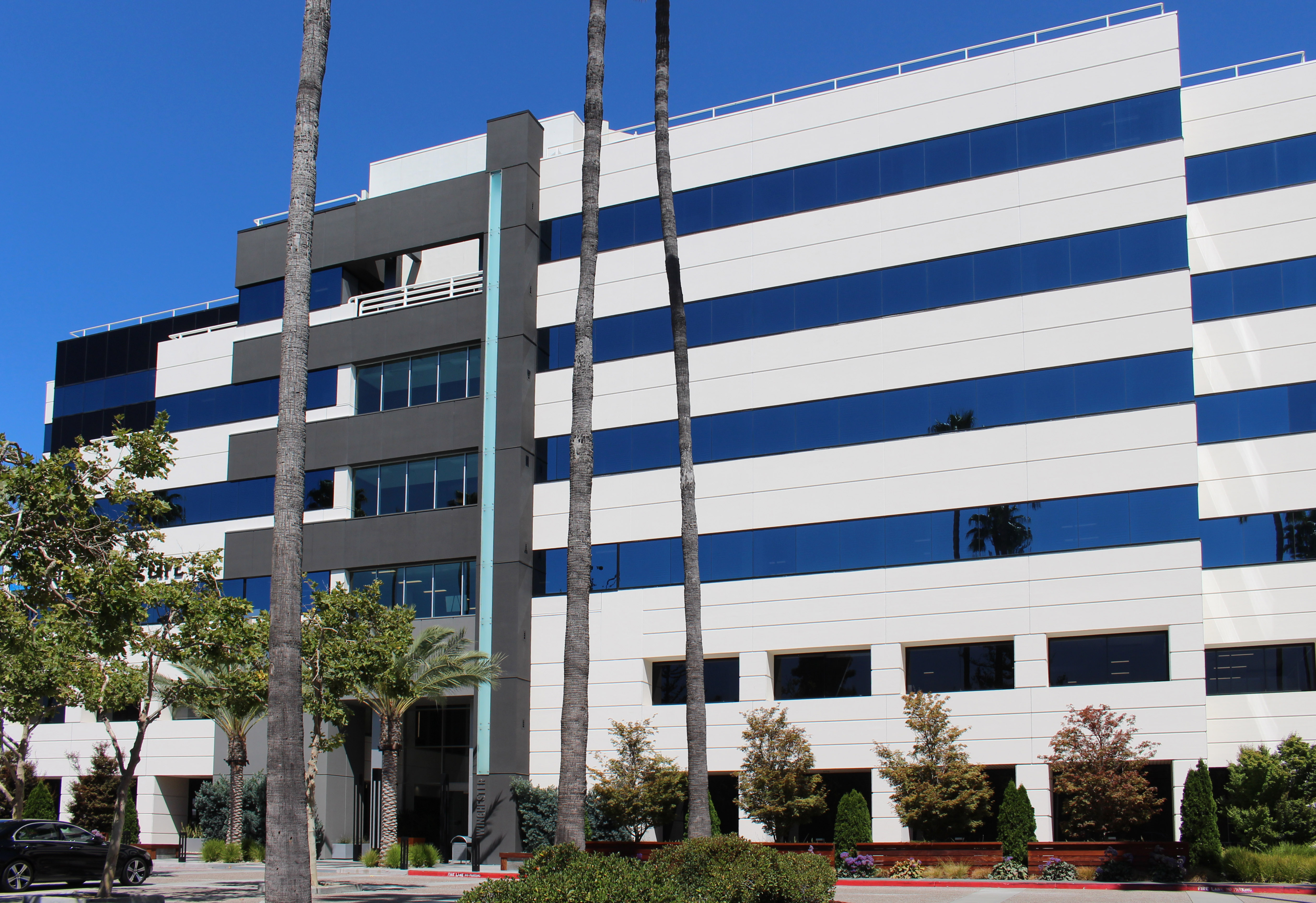
HDMI Licensing headquarters in San Jose, California (in Silicon Valley)

HDMI devices and cables are designed based on the HDMI Specification, a document published by HDMI Licensing (through version 1.4b) or the HDMI Forum (from version 2.0 onward). The HDMI Specification defines the minimum baseline requirements that all HDMI devices must adhere to for interoperability, as well as a large set of optional features that HDMI devices may support. The specification is periodically updated to add clarifications or define new capabilities that HDMI devices may implement. Each new version of the specification expands the list of possible features, but does not mandate support for new features in all devices or establish any "classes" of HDMI products which must support certain capabilities. Version numbers do not refer to classes or tiers of products with certain levels of feature support, and as such, HDMI specification "version numbers" are not a method of describing support for specific features or describing the capabilities of an HDMI device or cable.

In 2009, HDMI Licensing banned the use of "version numbers" in labeling HDMI products. Instead, HDMI devices should explicitly declare which features and capabilities they support. For HDMI cables, a speed rating system was established since feature support is not dependent on the cable (apart from inline Ethernet and ARC); the cable only affects the maximum possible speed of the connection. HDMI cables should be labeled with the appropriate speed certification (i.e. Standard Speed, High Speed, or Ultra High Speed), not a "version number".

=== Version 1.0 ===
HDMI 1.0 was released on December 9, 2002, and is a single-cable digital audio/video connector interface. The link architecture is based on DVI, using exactly the same video transmission format but sending audio and other auxiliary data during the blanking intervals of the video stream. HDMI 1.0 allows a maximum TMDS clock of 165 MHz (4.95 Gbit/s bandwidth per link), the same as DVI. It defines two connectors called type A and type B, with pinouts based on the Single-Link DVI-D and Dual-Link DVI-D connectors respectively, though the type B connector was never used in any commercial products. HDMI 1.0 uses TMDS encoding for video transmission, giving it 3.96 Gbit/s of video bandwidth (1920 × 1080 or 1920 × 1200 at 60 Hz) and 8-channel LPCM/192 kHz/24-bit audio. HDMI 1.0 requires support for RGB video, with optional support for Y′C_{B}C_{R} 4:4:4 and 4:2:2 (mandatory if the device has support for Y′C_{B}C_{R} on other interfaces). Color depth of 10 bpc (30 bit/px) or 12 bpc (36 bit/px) is allowed when using 4:2:2 subsampling, but only 8 bpc (24 bit/px) color depth is permitted when using RGB or Y′C_{B}C_{R} 4:4:4. Only the Rec. 601 and Rec. 709 color spaces are supported. HDMI 1.0 allows only specific pre-defined video formats, including all the formats defined in EIA/CEA-861-B and some additional formats listed in the HDMI Specification itself. All HDMI sources/sinks must also be capable of sending/receiving native Single-Link DVI video and be fully compliant with the DVI Specification.

=== Version 1.1 ===
HDMI 1.1 was released on May 20, 2004, and added support for DVD-Audio.

=== Version 1.2 ===
HDMI 1.2 was released on August 8, 2005, and added the option of One Bit Audio, used on Super Audio CDs, at up to 8 channels. To make HDMI more suitable for use on PC devices, version 1.2 also removed the requirement that only explicitly supported formats be used. It added the ability for manufacturers to create vendor-specific formats, allowing any arbitrary resolution and refresh rate rather than being limited to a pre-defined list of supported formats. In addition, it added explicit support for several new formats including 720p at 100 and 120 Hz and relaxed the pixel format support requirements so that sources with only native RGB output (PC sources) would not be required to support Y′C_{B}C_{R} output.

HDMI 1.2a was released on December 14, 2005 and fully specifies Consumer Electronic Control (CEC) features, command sets and CEC compliance tests.

=== Version 1.3 ===
HDMI 1.3 was released on June 22, 2006, and increased the maximum TMDS clock to 340 MHz (10.2 Gbit/s). Like previous versions, it uses TMDS encoding, giving it a maximum video bandwidth of 8.16 Gbit/s (sufficient for 1920 × 1080 at 144 Hz or 2560 × 1440 at 75 Hz). It added support for 10 bpc, 12 bpc, and 16 bpc color depth (30, 36, and 48 bit/px), called deep color. It also added support for the xvYCC color space, in addition to the ITU-R BT.601 and BT.709 color spaces supported by previous versions, and added the ability to carry metadata defining color gamut boundaries. It also optionally allows output of Dolby TrueHD and DTS-HD Master Audio streams for external decoding by AV receivers. It incorporates automatic audio syncing (audio video sync) capability. It defined cable Categories 1 and 2, with Category 1 cable being tested up to 74.25 MHz and Category 2 being tested up to 340 MHz. It also added the new HDMI type C "Mini" connector for portable devices.

HDMI 1.3a was released on November 10, 2006, and had cable and sink modifications for HDMI type C, source termination recommendations, and removed undershoot and maximum rise/fall time limits. It also changed CEC capacitance limits, and CEC commands for timer control were brought back in an altered form, with audio control commands added. It also added the optional ability to stream SACD in its bitstream DST format rather than uncompressed raw DSD. HDMI 1.3a is available to download free of charge, after registration.

=== Version 1.4 ===
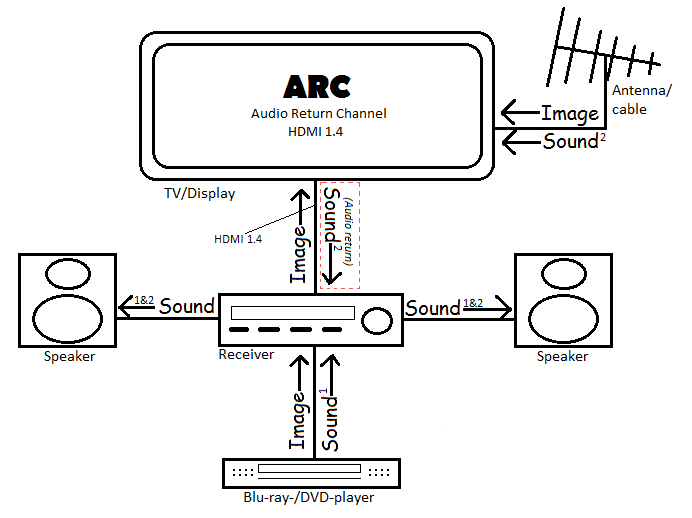
HDMI 1.4 with audio return channel

HDMI 1.4 was released on June 5, 2009, and first came to market after Q2 of 2009. Retaining the bandwidth of the previous version, HDMI 1.4 defined standardized timings to use for 4096 × 2160 at 24 Hz, 3840 × 2160 at 24, 25, and 30 Hz, and added explicit support for 1920 × 1080 at 120 Hz with CTA-861 timings. It also added an HDMI Ethernet Channel (HEC) that accommodates a 100 Mbit/s Ethernet connection between the two HDMI connected devices so they can share an Internet connection, introduced an audio return channel (ARC), 3D Over HDMI, a new Micro HDMI Connector, an expanded set of color spaces with the addition of sYCC601, Adobe RGB and Adobe YCC601, and an Automotive Connection System. HDMI 1.4 defined several stereoscopic 3D formats including field alternative (interlaced), frame packing (a full resolution top-bottom format), line alternative full, side-by-side half, side-by-side full, 2D + depth, and 2D + depth + graphics + graphics depth (WOWvx). HDMI 1.4 requires that 3D displays implement the frame packing 3D format at either 720p50 and 1080p24 or 720p60 and 1080p24. High Speed HDMI cables as defined in HDMI 1.3 work with all HDMI 1.4 features except for the HDMI Ethernet Channel, which requires the new High Speed HDMI Cable with Ethernet defined in HDMI 1.4.

HDMI 1.4a was released on March 4, 2010, and added two mandatory 3D formats for broadcast content, which was deferred with HDMI 1.4 pending the direction of the 3D broadcast market. HDMI 1.4a has defined mandatory 3D formats for broadcast, game, and movie content. HDMI 1.4a requires that 3D displays implement the frame packing 3D format at either 720p50 and 1080p24 or 720p60 and 1080p24, side-by-side horizontal at either 1080i50 or 1080i60, and top-and-bottom at either 720p50 and 1080p24 or 720p60 and 1080p24.

HDMI 1.4b was released on October 11, 2011, containing only minor clarifications to the 1.4a document. HDMI 1.4b is the last version of the standard that HDMI LA is responsible for. All later versions of the HDMI Specification are produced by the HDMI Forum, created on October 25, 2011.

=== Version 2.0 ===
HDMI 2.0, referred to by some manufacturers as HDMI UHD, was released on September 4, 2013.

HDMI 2.0 increases the maximum bandwidth to 18.0 Gbit/s. HDMI 2.0 uses TMDS encoding for video transmission like previous versions, giving it a maximum video bandwidth of 14.4 Gbit/s. This enables HDMI 2.0 to carry 4K video at 60 Hz with 24 bit/px color depth. Other features of HDMI 2.0 include support for the Rec. 2020 color space, up to 32 audio channels, up to 1536 kHz audio sample frequency, dual video streams to multiple users on the same screen, up to four audio streams, 4:2:0 chroma subsampling, 25 fps 3D formats, support for the 21:9 aspect ratio, dynamic synchronization of video and audio streams, the HE-AAC and DRA audio standards, improved 3D capability, and additional CEC functions.

HDMI 2.0a was released on April 8, 2015, and added support for High Dynamic Range (HDR) video with static metadata.

HDMI 2.0b was released March 2016. HDMI 2.0b initially supported the same HDR10 standard as HDMI 2.0a as specified in the CTA-861.3 specification. In December 2016 additional support for HDR Video transport was added to HDMI 2.0b in the CTA-861-G specification, which extends the static metadata signaling to include hybrid log–gamma (HLG).

=== Version 2.1 ===
HDMI 2.1 was officially announced by the HDMI Forum on January 4, 2017, and was released on November 28, 2017. It adds support for higher resolutions and higher refresh rates, including 4K 120 Hz and 8K 60 Hz. HDMI 2.1 also introduces a new HDMI cable category called Ultra High Speed (referred to as 48G during development), which certifies cables at the new higher speeds that these formats require. Ultra High Speed HDMI cables are backwards compatible with older HDMI devices, and older cables are compatible with new HDMI 2.1 devices, though the full 48 Gbit/s bandwidth is only supported with the new cables.

Some systems may not be able to use HDMI 2.1 because the HDMI Forum is preventing its use in open source implementations (such as Linux open source drivers). Users of those systems may need to use DisplayPort instead to access high resolutions and speeds.

The following features were added to the HDMI 2.1 Specification:

- Maximum supported format is 10K at 120 Hz
- Dynamic HDR for specifying HDR metadata on a scene-by-scene or even a frame-by-frame basis
  - Note: While HDMI 2.1 did standardize transport of dynamic HDR metadata over HDMI, in actuality it only formalized dynamic metadata interfaces already utilized by Dolby Vision and HDR10+ in HDMI 2.0, which is why neither Dolby Vision nor HDR10+ require HDMI 2.1 to function properly.
- Display Stream Compression (DSC) 1.2 is used for video formats higher than 8K with 4:2:0 chroma subsampling
- High Frame Rate (HFR) for 4K, 8K, and 10K, which adds support for refresh rates up to 120 Hz
- Enhanced Audio Return Channel (eARC) for object-based audio formats such as Dolby Atmos and DTS:X
- Enhanced refresh rate and latency reduction features:
  - Variable Refresh Rate (VRR) reduces or eliminates lag, stutter and frame tearing for more fluid motion in games
  - Quick Media Switching (QMS) for movies and video eliminates the delay that can result in blank screens before content begins to be displayed
  - Quick Frame Transport (QFT) reduces latency by bursting individual pictures across the HDMI link as fast as possible when the link's hardware supports more bandwidth than the minimum amount needed for the resolution and frame rate of the content. With QFT, individual pictures arrive earlier and some hardware blocks can be fully powered off for longer periods of time between pictures to reduce heat generation and extend battery life.
- Auto Low Latency Mode (ALLM) – Allows the HDMI source device to direct the display to optimize either for low latency at the expense of image quality or for image quality at the expense of latency, presumably according to the content.

Video formats that require more bandwidth than 18.0 Gbit/s (4K 60 Hz 8 bpc RGB), such as 4K 60 Hz 10 bpc (HDR), 4K 120 Hz, and 8K 60 Hz, may require the new "Ultra High Speed" or "Ultra High Speed with Ethernet" cables. HDMI 2.1's other new features are supported with existing HDMI cables.

The increase in maximum bandwidth is achieved by increasing both the bitrate of the data channels and the number of channels. Previous HDMI versions use three data channels (each operating at up to 6.0 Gbit/s in HDMI 2.0, or up to 3.4 Gbit/s in HDMI 1.4), with an additional channel for the TMDS clock signal, which runs at a fraction of the data channel speed (one tenth the speed, or up to 340 MHz, for signaling rates up to 3.4 Gbit/s; one fortieth the speed, or up to 150 MHz, for signaling rates between 3.4 and 6.0 Gbit/s). HDMI 2.1 doubles the signaling rate of the data channels to 12 Gbit/s. The structure of the data has been changed to use a new packet-based format with an embedded clock signal, which allows what was formerly the TMDS clock channel to be used as a fourth data channel instead, increasing the signaling rate across that channel to 12 Gbit/s as well. These changes increase the aggregate bandwidth from 18.0 Gbit/s (3 × 6.0 Gbit/s) to 48.0 Gbit/s (4 × 12.0 Gbit/s), a 2.66× improvement in bandwidth. In addition, the data is transmitted more efficiently by using a 16b/18b encoding scheme, which uses a larger percentage of the bandwidth for data rather than DC balancing compared to the TMDS scheme used by previous versions (88.8̅% compared to 80%). This, in combination with the 2.66× bandwidth, raises the maximum data rate of HDMI 2.1 from 14.4 Gbit/s to 42.6̅ Gbit/s. Subtracting overhead for FEC, the usable data rate is approximately 42.0 Gbit/s, around 2.92× the data rate of HDMI 2.0.

The 48 Gbit/s bandwidth provided by HDMI 2.1 is enough for 8K resolution at approximately 50 Hz, with 8 bpc RGB or Y′C_{B}C_{R} 4:4:4 color. To achieve even higher formats, HDMI 2.1 can use Display Stream Compression (DSC) with a compression ratio of up to 3∶1. Using DSC, formats up to 8K (7680 × 4320) 120 Hz or 10K (10240 × 4320) 100 Hz at 8 bpc RGB/4:4:4 are possible. Using Y′C_{B}C_{R} with 4:2:2 or 4:2:0 chroma subsampling in combination with DSC can allow for even higher formats.

HDMI 2.1a was released on February 15, 2022, and added support for Source-Based Tone Mapping (SBTM).

HDMI 2.1b was released on August 10, 2023.

=== Version 2.2 ===
HDMI 2.2 was announced on January 6, 2025, it was released on June 25, 2025. The maximum allowed bit rate is increased to 96 Gbit/s and Latency Indication Protocol (LIP) support is added for improving audio and video synchronization.

=== Version comparison ===
==== Main specifications ====
HDMI version	1.0–1.2a	1.3–1.3a	1.4–1.4b	2.0–2.0b	2.1–2.1b	2.2
Release date	Dec 2002 (1.0); May 2004 (1.1); Aug 2005 (1.2); Dec 2005 (1.2a)	Jun 2006 (1.3); Nov 2006 (1.3a)	Jun 2009 (1.4); Mar 2010 (1.4a); Oct 2011 (1.4b)	Sep 2013 (2.0); Apr 2015 (2.0a); Mar 2016 (2.0b)	Nov 2017 (2.1); Feb 2022 (2.1a) Aug 2023 (2.1b)	Jun 2025
Signal specifications
Max. transmission bit rate (Gbit/s) (Note: Total transmission bit rate is equal to the number of data channels multiplied by the bit rate per channel (binary digits transmitted per second). Each channel transmits one bit (binary digit) per signal, and signals at ten times the character rate. Therefore, the total transmission bit rate (in Mbit/s) = 10 bits × (character rate in MHz) × (# of data channels).)	4.95	10.2	10.2	18.0	48.0	96.0
Max. data rate (Gbit/s) (Note: Some of the transmitted bits are used for encoding purposes rather than representing data, so the rate at which video data can be transmitted across the HDMI interface is only a portion of the total bit rate.)	3.96	8.16	8.16	14.4	42.0	84.0
Max. TMDS character rate (MHz) (Note: The TMDS character rate is the number of 10-bit TMDS characters per second transmitted across one HDMI data channel. This is sometimes informally referred to as the pixel clock or TMDS clock because these terms were once equivalent in past HDMI versions.)	165	340	340	600	600	600
Data channels	3	3	3	3	4	4
Encoding scheme (Note: TMDS encoding uses 10 bits of the transmission to send 8 bits of data, so only 80% of the transmission bit rate is available for data throughput. 16b/18b encoding uses 18 bits of bandwidth to send 16 bits of data, so 88.8̅% of the transmission bit rate is available for data throughput.)	TMDS	TMDS	TMDS	TMDS	16b/18b	16b/18b
Encoding efficiency	80%	80%	80%	80%	88.8̅%	88.8̅%
Compression	–	–	–	–	DSC 1.2a (optional)	DSC 1.2a
Color format support
RGB	Yes	Yes	Yes	Yes	Yes	Yes
Y′C_{B}C_{R} 4:4:4	Yes	Yes	Yes	Yes	Yes	Yes
Y′C_{B}C_{R} 4:2:2	Yes	Yes	Yes	Yes	Yes	Yes
Y′C_{B}C_{R} 4:2:0	No	No	No (Note: Although HDMI 1.4 does not officially allow 4:2:0 chroma subsampling, NVIDIA and AMD have added 4:2:0 support to their HDMI 1.4 graphics cards via driver updates)	Yes	Yes	Yes
Color depth support
8 bpc (24 bit/px)	Yes	Yes	Yes	Yes	Yes	Yes
10 bpc (30 bit/px)	Yes (Note: HDMI 1.0–1.2a permit 10 bpc and 12 bpc color depth only when Y′C_{B}C_{R} 4:2:2 color format is used. When using RGB or Y′C_{B}C_{R} 4:4:4, only 8 bpc color is permitted.)	Yes	Yes	Yes	Yes	Yes
12 bpc (36 bit/px)	Yes	Yes	Yes	Yes	Yes	Yes
16 bpc (48 bit/px)	No	Yes	Yes	Yes	Yes	Yes
Color space support
SMPTE 170M	Yes	Yes	Yes	Yes	Yes	Yes
ITU-R BT.601	Yes	Yes	Yes	Yes	Yes	Yes
ITU-R BT.709	Yes	Yes	Yes	Yes	Yes	Yes
sRGB	No	Yes	Yes	Yes	Yes	Yes
xvYCC (_{601} and _{709})	No	Yes	Yes	Yes	Yes	Yes
sYCC_{601} (Note: sRGB with BT.601 matrix, defined in IEC 61966-2-1/Amendment 1. Able to represent out-of-gamut colors à la xvYCC.)	No	No	Yes	Yes	Yes	Yes
Adobe YCC_{601} (Note: Adobe RGB with BT.601 matrix, defined in IEC 61966-2-5 Annex A.)	No	No	Yes	Yes	Yes	Yes
Adobe RGB (1998)	No	No	Yes	Yes	Yes	Yes
ITU-R BT.2020	No	No	No	Yes	Yes	Yes
Audio specifications
Max. sample rate per channel (kHz)	192	192	192	192	192	192
Max. aggregate sample rate (kHz)	?	?	768	1536	1536	1536
Sample size (bits)	16–24	16–24	16–24	16–24	16–24	16–24
Max. audio channels	8	8	8	32	32	32
HDMI version	1.0–1.2a	1.3–1.3a	1.4–1.4b	2.0–2.0b	2.1–2.1b	2.2

== Resolution and refresh frequency limits ==
=== Refresh frequency limits for common resolutions ===
The maximum limits for TMDS transmission are calculated using standard data rate calculations. For FRL transmission, the limits are calculated using the capacity computation algorithm provided by the HDMI Specification. All calculations assume uncompressed RGB video with CVT-RB v2 timing. Maximum limits may differ if compression (i.e. DSC) or Y′C_{B}C_{R} 4:2:0 chroma subsampling are used.

Display manufacturers may also use non-standard blanking intervals (a Vendor-Specific Timing Format as defined in the HDMI Specification) rather than CVT-RB v2 to achieve even higher frequencies when bandwidth is a constraint. The refresh frequencies in the below table do not represent the absolute maximum limit of each interface, but rather an estimate based on a modern standardized timing formula. The minimum blanking intervals (and therefore the exact maximum frequency that can be achieved) will depend on the display and how many secondary data packets it requires, and therefore will differ from model to model.

Video format			TMDS character rate; maximum data rate (Note: 165 MHz was the maximum TMDS character rate allowed in version 1.2a of the HDMI Specification and earlier. In version 1.3, the maximum allowed speed was increased to 340 MHz, and in version 2.0 it was increased to 600 MHz. These are only the maximum speeds permitted by the specification; individual devices may be limited to any speed within the maximum allowed.)			FRL transmission mode; maximum data rate								
Shorthand	Resolution	Channel color depth (bits)	165 MHz TMDS	340 MHz TMDS	600 MHz TMDS	FRL 9G	FRL 18G	FRL 24G	FRL 32G	FRL 40G	FRL 48G	FRL 64G	FRL 80G	FRL 96G
Shorthand	Resolution	Channel color depth (bits)	3.96 Gbit/s	8.16 Gbit/s	14.4 Gbit/s	7.88 Gbit/s	15.8 Gbit/s	21.0 Gbit/s	28.0 Gbit/s	35.0 Gbit/s	42.0 Gbit/s	56.0 Gbit/s	70.0 Gbit/s	84.0 Gbit/s
Shorthand	Resolution	Channel color depth (bits)	Maximum refresh frequency with CVT-RB v2 timing (Hz) (Note: Calculations are based on uncompressed RGB video with 8 channels of LPCM audio)											
1080p	1920 × 1080	8	73	146	246	143	268	343	435	518	593	725	836	932
1080p	1920 × 1080	10	59	118	201	116	220	284	363	436	503	623	726	817
1440p	2560 × 1440	8	42	85	147	83	160	209	270	327	381	480	569	649
1440p	2560 × 1440	10	34	69	119	67	130	170	222	270	316	402	481	553
UWQHD	3440 × 1440	8	32	65	112	63	122	160	208	254	298	380	456	525
UWQHD	3440 × 1440	10	25	52	90	50	99	130	170	208	246	316	381	442
4K	3840 × 2160	8		39	68	38	75	98	129	159	189	245	297	348
4K	3840 × 2160	10		31	55	30	60	79	105	130	154	200	245	288
5K	5120 × 2880	8			39		43	56	75	93	111	145	178	211
5K	5120 × 2880	10			31		34	45	60	75	89	118	145	172
8K	7680 × 4320	8						25	34	42	50	67	83	99
8K	7680 × 4320	10							27	34	40	54	67	80
10K	10240 × 4320	8							25	32	38	51	63	75
10K	10240 × 4320	10								25	30	41	51	61

0–59 Hz
60–119 Hz
120–239 Hz
240+ Hz

=== Refresh frequency limits for standard video ===
HDMI 1.0 and 1.1 are restricted to transmitting only certain video formats, defined in EIA/CEA-861-B and in the HDMI Specification itself. HDMI 1.2 and all later versions allow any arbitrary resolution and frame rate (within the bandwidth limit). Formats that are not supported by the HDMI Specification (i.e., no standardized timings defined) may be implemented as a vendor-specific format. Successive versions of the HDMI Specification continue to add support for additional formats (such as 4K resolutions), but the added support is to establish standardized timings to ensure interoperability between products, not to establish which formats are or are not permitted. Video formats do not require explicit support from the HDMI Specification in order to be transmitted and displayed.

Individual products may have heavier limitations than those listed below, since HDMI devices are not required to support the maximum bandwidth of the HDMI version that they implement. Therefore, it is not guaranteed that a display will support the refresh rates listed in this table, even if the display has the required HDMI version.

Uncompressed 8 bpc (24 bit/px) color depth and RGB or Y′C_{B}C_{R} 4:4:4 color format are assumed on this table except where noted.

Video format				HDMI version / maximum data rate / cable certification					
Shorthand	Resolution	Refresh rate (Hz)	Data rate required (Note: Uncompressed 8 bpc (24 bit/px) color depth with RGB or Y′C_{B}C_{R} 4:4:4 color format and CVT-RB v2 timing are used to calculate these data rates. Uncompressed data rate for RGB images in bits per second is calculated as bits per pixel × pixels per frame × frames per second. Pixels per frame includes blanking intervals as defined by CVT-RB v2.)	1.0–1.1	1.2–1.2a	1.3–1.4b	2.0–2.0b	2.1–2.1b	2.2
Shorthand	Resolution	Refresh rate (Hz)	Data rate required	3.96 Gbit/s		8.16 Gbit/s	14.4 Gbit/s	42.0 Gbit/s	84.0 Gbit/s
Shorthand	Resolution	Refresh rate (Hz)	Data rate required	High speed (Note: The Standard HDMI cable certification (Category 1) only tests up to 74.25 MHz (2.2275 Gbit/s). Therefore, only High Speed HDMI cables or above are rated for the maximum allowed speed, even for versions that predate the introduction of the High Speed certification.)			Premium high speed	Ultra high speed	Ultra96
720p	1280 × 720	30	720 Mbit/s	Yes	Yes	Yes	Yes	Yes	Yes
720p	1280 × 720	60	1.45 Gbit/s	Yes	Yes	Yes	Yes	Yes	Yes
720p	1280 × 720	120	2.99 Gbit/s	No	Yes	Yes	Yes	Yes	Yes
1080p	1920 × 1080	30	1.58 Gbit/s	Yes	Yes	Yes	Yes	Yes	Yes
1080p	1920 × 1080	60	3.20 Gbit/s	Yes	Yes	Yes	Yes	Yes	Yes
1080p	1920 × 1080	120	6.59 Gbit/s	No	No	Yes	Yes	Yes	Yes
1080p	1920 × 1080	144	8.00 Gbit/s	No	No	Yes	Yes	Yes	Yes
1080p	1920 × 1080	240	14.00 Gbit/s	No	No	4:2:0 (Note: Possible by using Y′C_{B}C_{R} with 4:2:0 subsampling)	Yes	Yes	Yes
1440p	2560 × 1440	30	2.78 Gbit/s	No	Yes	Yes	Yes	Yes	Yes
1440p	2560 × 1440	60	5.63 Gbit/s	No	No	Yes	Yes	Yes	Yes
1440p	2560 × 1440	75	7.09 Gbit/s	No	No	Yes	Yes	Yes	Yes
1440p	2560 × 1440	120	11.59 Gbit/s	No	No	4:2:0	Yes	Yes	Yes
1440p	2560 × 1440	144	14.08 Gbit/s	No	No	4:2:0	Yes	Yes	Yes
1440p	2560 × 1440	240	24.62 Gbit/s	No	No	No	4:2:0	Yes	Yes
4K	3840 × 2160	30	6.18 Gbit/s	No	No	Yes	Yes	Yes	Yes
4K	3840 × 2160	60	12.54 Gbit/s	No	No	4:2:0	Yes	Yes	Yes
4K	3840 × 2160	75	15.79 Gbit/s	No	No	4:2:0	4:2:0	Yes	Yes
4K	3840 × 2160	120	25.82 Gbit/s	No	No	No	4:2:0	Yes	Yes
4K	3840 × 2160	144	31.35 Gbit/s	No	No	No	No	Yes	Yes
4K	3840 × 2160	240	54.84 Gbit/s	No	No	No	No	DSC (Note: Possible by using Display Stream Compression (DSC))	Yes
5K	5120 × 2880	30	10.94 Gbit/s	No	No	4:2:0	Yes	Yes	Yes
5K	5120 × 2880	60	22.18 Gbit/s	No	No	No	4:2:0	Yes	Yes
5K	5120 × 2880	120	45.66 Gbit/s	No	No	No	No	DSC	Yes
5K	5120 × 2880	144	55.44 Gbit/s	No	No	No	No	DSC	Yes
5K	5120 × 2880	240	96.98 Gbit/s	No	No	No	No	DSC	DSC
8K	7680 × 4320	30	24.48 Gbit/s	No	No	No	4:2:0	Yes	Yes
8K	7680 × 4320	60	49.65 Gbit/s	No	No	No	No	DSC	Yes
8K	7680 × 4320	120	102.2 Gbit/s	No	No	No	No	DSC	DSC
8K	7680 × 4320	144	124.1 Gbit/s	No	No	No	No	4:2:2 + DSC (Note: Possible by using Y′C_{B}C_{R} with 4:2:2 subsampling and DSC together, which permits a lower DSC bit rate of 7 bit/px)	DSC
8K	7680 × 4320	240	217.1 Gbit/s	No	No	No	No	No	DSC
10K	10240 × 4320	30	32.55 Gbit/s	No	No	No	No	Yes	Yes
10K	10240 × 4320	60	66.03 Gbit/s	No	No	No	No	DSC	Yes
10K	10240 × 4320	100	112.2 Gbit/s	No	No	No	No	DSC	DSC
10K	10240 × 4320	120	135.9 Gbit/s	No	No	No	No	4:2:2 + DSC	DSC
10K	10240 × 4320	144	165.0 Gbit/s	No	No	No	No	No	DSC
10K	10240 × 4320	240	288.7 Gbit/s	No	No	No	No	No	4:2:0 + DSC (Note: Possible by using Y′C_{B}C_{R} with 4:2:0 subsampling and DSC together, which permits a lower DSC bit rate of 6 bit/px)
				1.0–1.1	1.2–1.2a	1.3–1.4b	2.0–2.0b	2.1–2.1b	2.2
HDMI version

=== Refresh frequency limits for HDR10 video ===
HDR10 requires 10 bpc (30 bit/px) color depth, which uses 25% more bandwidth than standard 8 bpc video.

Uncompressed 10 bpc color depth and RGB or Y′C_{B}C_{R} 4:4:4 color format are assumed on this table except where noted.

Video format				HDMI version / maximum data rate		
Shorthand	Resolution	Refresh rate (Hz)	Data rate required (Note: Uncompressed 10 bpc (30 bit/px) color depth with RGB or Y′C_{B}C_{R} 4:4:4 color format and CVT-RB v2 timing are used to calculate these data rates. Uncompressed data rate for RGB images in bits per second is calculated as bits per pixel × pixels per frame × frames per second. Pixels per frame includes blanking intervals as defined by CVT-RB v2.)	2.0a–2.0b	2.1–2.1b	2.2
Shorthand	Resolution	Refresh rate (Hz)	Data rate required	14.4 Gbit/s	42.0 Gbit/s	84.0 Gbit/s
1080p	1920 × 1080	60	4.00 Gbit/s	Yes	Yes	Yes
1080p	1920 × 1080	120	8.24 Gbit/s	Yes	Yes	Yes
1080p	1920 × 1080	144	10.00 Gbit/s	Yes	Yes	Yes
1080p	1920 × 1080	240	17.50 Gbit/s	4:2:0 (Note: Possible by using Y′C_{B}C_{R} with 4:2:0 subsampling)	Yes	Yes
1440p	2560 × 1440	60	7.04 Gbit/s	Yes	Yes	Yes
1440p	2560 × 1440	100	11.96 Gbit/s	Yes	Yes	Yes
1440p	2560 × 1440	120	14.49 Gbit/s	4:2:0	Yes	Yes
1440p	2560 × 1440	144	17.60 Gbit/s	4:2:0	Yes	Yes
1440p	2560 × 1440	240	30.77 Gbit/s	No	Yes	Yes
4K	3840 × 2160	50	13.00 Gbit/s	Yes	Yes	Yes
4K	3840 × 2160	60	15.68 Gbit/s	4:2:0	Yes	Yes
4K	3840 × 2160	120	32.27 Gbit/s	No	Yes	Yes
4K	3840 × 2160	144	39.19 Gbit/s	No	Yes	Yes
4K	3840 × 2160	240	68.56 Gbit/s	No	DSC (Note: Possible by using Display Stream Compression (DSC))	Yes
5K	5120 × 2880	30	13.67 Gbit/s	Yes	Yes	Yes
5K	5120 × 2880	60	27.72 Gbit/s	4:2:0	Yes	Yes
5K	5120 × 2880	120	57.08 Gbit/s	No	DSC	Yes
5K	5120 × 2880	144	69.30 Gbit/s	No	DSC	Yes
5K	5120 × 2880	240	121.2 Gbit/s	No	DSC	DSC
8K	7680 × 4320	30	30.60 Gbit/s	No	Yes	Yes
8K	7680 × 4320	60	62.06 Gbit/s	No	DSC	Yes
8K	7680 × 4320	120	127.8 Gbit/s	No	DSC	DSC
8K	7680 × 4320	144	155.1 Gbit/s	No	4:2:2 + DSC (Note: Possible by using Y′C_{B}C_{R} with 4:2:2 subsampling and DSC together, which permits a lower DSC bit rate of 7 bit/px)	DSC
8K	7680 × 4320	240	271.4 Gbit/s	No	No	DSC
10K	10240 × 4320	30	40.69 Gbit/s	No	Yes	Yes
10K	10240 × 4320	60	82.53 Gbit/s	No	DSC	Yes
10K	10240 × 4320	100	140.2 Gbit/s	No	DSC	DSC
10K	10240 × 4320	120	169.9 Gbit/s	No	4:2:2 + DSC	DSC
10K	10240 × 4320	144	206.3 Gbit/s	No	No	DSC
10K	10240 × 4320	240	360.9 Gbit/s	No	No	4:2:0 + DSC (Note: Possible by using Y′C_{B}C_{R} with 4:2:0 subsampling and DSC together, which permits a lower DSC bit rate of 6 bit/px)
				2.0a–2.0b	2.1–2.1b	2.2
HDMI version

=== Feature support ===
The features defined in the HDMI specification that an HDMI device may implement are listed below. For historical interest, the version of the HDMI specification in which the feature was first added is also listed. All features of the HDMI specification are optional; HDMI devices may implement any combination of these features.

Although the "HDMI version numbers" are commonly misused as a way of indicating that a device supports certain features, this notation has no official meaning and is considered improper by HDMI Licensing. There is no officially defined correlation between features supported by a device and any claimed "version numbers", as version numbers refer to historical editions of the HDMI specification document, not to particular classes of HDMI devices. Manufacturers are forbidden from describing their devices using HDMI version numbers, and are required to identify support for features by listing explicit support for them, but the HDMI forum has received criticism for lack of enforcement of these policies.

- Full HD Blu-ray Disc and HD DVD video (version 1.0) (Note: Even for a compressed audio codec that a given HDMI device cannot transport, the source device may be able to decode the audio codec and transmit the audio as uncompressed LPCM.)
- Consumer Electronic Control (CEC) (version 1.0) (Note: CEC has been in the HDMI specification since version 1.0, but only began to see implementation in consumer electronics products in 2008)
- DVD-Audio (version 1.1)
- Super Audio CD (DSD) (version 1.2)
- Auto Lip-Sync Correction (version 1.3)
- Dolby TrueHD / DTS-HD Master Audio bitstream capable (version 1.3)
- Updated list of CEC commands (version 1.3a) (Note: Large number of additions and clarifications for CEC commands. One addition is CEC command, allowing for volume control of an AV receiver.)
- 3D video (version 1.4)
- Ethernet channel (100 Mbit/s) (version 1.4)
- Audio return channel (ARC) (version 1.4)
- 4 audio streams (version 2.0)
- Dual View (version 2.0)
- Perceptual quantizer HDR EOTF (SMPTE ST 2084) (version 2.0a)
- Hybrid log–gamma (HLG) HDR EOTF (version 2.0a)
- Static HDR metadata (SMPTE ST 2086) (version 2.0a)
- Dynamic HDR metadata (SMPTE ST 2094) (version 2.0b)
- Enhanced audio return channel (eARC) (version 2.1)
- Variable Refresh Rate (VRR) (version 2.1)
- Quick Media Switching (QMS) (version 2.1)
- Quick Frame Transport (QFT) (version 2.1)
- Auto Low Latency Mode (ALLM) (version 2.1)
- Display Stream Compression (DSC) (version 2.1)
- Source-Based Tone Mapping (SBTM) (version 2.1a)

=== Display Stream Compression ===
Display Stream Compression (DSC) is a VESA-developed video compression algorithm designed to enable increased display resolutions and frame rates over existing physical interfaces, and make devices smaller and lighter, with longer battery life.

== Applications ==
=== Blu-ray Disc and HD DVD players ===
Blu-ray Disc and HD DVD, introduced in 2006, offer high-fidelity audio features that require HDMI for best results. HDMI 1.3 can transport Dolby Digital Plus, Dolby TrueHD, and DTS-HD Master Audio bitstreams in compressed form. This capability allows for an AV receiver with the necessary decoder to decode the compressed audio stream. The Blu-ray specification does not include video encoded with either deep color or xvYCC; thus, HDMI 1.0 can transfer Blu-ray discs at full video quality.

The HDMI 1.4 specification (released in 2009) added support for 3D video and is used by all Blu-ray 3D compatible players.

The Blu-ray Disc Association (BDA) spokespersons have stated (Sept. 2014 at IFA show in Berlin, Germany) that the Blu-ray, Ultra HD players, and 4K discs are expected to be available starting in the second half to 2015. It is anticipated that such Blu-ray UHD players will be required to include a HDMI 2.0 output that supports HDCP 2.2.

Blu-ray permits secondary audio decoding, whereby the disc content can tell the player to mix multiple audio sources together before final output. Some Blu-ray and HD DVD players can decode all of the audio codecs internally and can output LPCM audio over HDMI. Multichannel LPCM can be transported over an HDMI connection, and as long as the AV receiver implements multichannel LPCM audio over HDMI and implements HDCP, the audio reproduction is equal in resolution to HDMI 1.3 bitstream output. Some low-cost AV receivers, such as the Onkyo TX-SR506, do not allow audio processing over HDMI and are labelled as "HDMI pass through" devices. Virtually all modern AV Receivers now offer HDMI 1.4 inputs and outputs with processing for all of the audio formats offered by Blu-ray Discs and other HD video sources. During 2014 several manufacturers introduced premium AV Receivers that include one, or multiple, HDMI 2.0 inputs along with a HDMI 2.0 output(s). However, not until 2015 did most major manufacturers of AV receivers also support HDCP 2.2 as needed to support certain high quality UHD video sources, such as Blu-ray UHD players.

=== Digital cameras and camcorders ===
Most consumer camcorders, as well as many digital cameras, are equipped with a mini-HDMI connector (type C connector).

Some cameras also have 4K capability, although cameras capable of HD video often include an HDMI interface for playback or even live preview, the image processor and the video processor of cameras usable for uncompressed video must be able to deliver the full image resolution at the specified frame rate in real time without any missing frames causing jitter. In addition, to be used as a video source, such as for streaming or switching, the camera must also be capable of removing the UI elements from the image. Therefore, usable uncompressed video out of HDMI without the device's UI elements is often called "clean HDMI".

=== Personal computers ===
Personal computers (PCs) with a DVI interface are capable of video output to an HDMI-enabled monitor. Some PCs include an HDMI interface and may also be capable of HDMI audio output, depending on specific hardware. For example, Intel's motherboard chipsets since the 945G and NVIDIA's GeForce 8200/8300 motherboard chipsets are capable of 8-channel LPCM output over HDMI. Eight-channel LPCM audio output over HDMI with a video card was first seen with the ATI Radeon HD 4850, which was released in June 2008 and is implemented by other video cards in the ATI Radeon HD 4000 series. Linux can drive 8-channel LPCM audio over HDMI if the video card has the necessary hardware and implements the Advanced Linux Sound Architecture (ALSA). The ATI Radeon HD 4000 series implements ALSA. Cyberlink announced in June 2008 that they would update their PowerDVD playback software to allow 192 kHz/24-bit Blu-ray Disc audio decoding in Q3-Q4 of 2008. Corel's WinDVD 9 Plus currently has 96 kHz/24-bit Blu-ray Disc audio decoding.

Even with an HDMI output, a computer may not be able to produce signals that implement HDCP, Microsoft's Protected Video Path, or Microsoft's Protected Audio Path. Several early graphic cards were labelled as "HDCP-enabled" but did not have the hardware needed for HDCP; this included some graphic cards based on the ATI X1600 chipset and certain models of the NVIDIA Geforce 7900 series. The first computer monitors that could process HDCP were released in 2005; by February 2006 a dozen different models had been released. The Protected Video Path was enabled in graphic cards that had HDCP capability, since it was required for output of Blu-ray Disc and HD DVD video. In comparison, the Protected Audio Path was required only if a lossless audio bitstream (such as Dolby TrueHD or DTS-HD MA) was output. Uncompressed LPCM audio, however, does not require a Protected Audio Path, and software programs such as PowerDVD and WinDVD can decode Dolby TrueHD and DTS-HD MA and output it as LPCM. A limitation is that if the computer does not implement a Protected Audio Path, the audio must be downsampled to 16-bit 48 kHz but can still output at up to 8 channels. No graphic cards were released in 2008 that implemented the Protected Audio Path.

The Asus Xonar HDAV1.3 became the first HDMI sound card that implemented the Protected Audio Path and could both bitstream and decode lossless audio (Dolby TrueHD and DTS-HD MA), although bitstreaming is only available if using the ArcSoft TotalMedia Theatre software. It has an HDMI 1.3 input/output, and Asus says that it can work with most video cards on the market.

Legacy interfaces such as VGA, DVI and LVDS have not kept pace, and newer standards such as DisplayPort and HDMI clearly provide the best connectivity options moving forward. In our opinion, DisplayPort 1.2 is the future interface for PC monitors, along with HDMI 1.4a for TV connectivity.

— "Leading PC Companies Move to All Digital Display Technology, Phasing Out Analog". Intel. December 8, 2010. Archived from the original on January 18, 2016.

In September 2009, AMD announced the ATI Radeon HD 5000 series video cards, which have HDMI 1.3 output (deep color, xvYCC wide gamut capability and high bit rate audio), 8-channel LPCM over HDMI, and an integrated HD audio controller with a Protected Audio Path that allows bitstream output over HDMI for AAC, Dolby AC-3, Dolby TrueHD and DTS-HD Master Audio formats. The ATI Radeon HD 5870 released in September 2009 is the first video card that allows bitstream output over HDMI for Dolby TrueHD and DTS-HD Master Audio. The AMD Radeon HD 6000 series implements HDMI 1.4a. The AMD Radeon HD 7000 series implements HDMI 1.4b.

In December 2010, it was announced that several computer vendors and display makers including Intel, AMD, Dell, Lenovo, Samsung, and LG would stop using LVDS (actually, FPD-Link) from 2013 and legacy DVI and VGA connectors from 2015, replacing them with DisplayPort and HDMI.

On August 27, 2012, Asus announced a new 27 in (69 cm) monitor that produces its native resolution of 2560×1440 via HDMI 1.4.

On September 18, 2014, Nvidia launched GeForce GTX 980 and GTX 970 (with GM204 chip) with HDMI 2.0 support. On January 22, 2015, GeForce GTX 960 (with GM206 chip) launched with HDMI 2.0 support. On March 17, 2015, GeForce GTX TITAN X (GM200) launched with HDMI 2.0 support. On June 1, 2015, GeForce GTX 980 Ti (with GM200 chip) launched with HDMI 2.0 support. On August 20, 2015, GeForce GTX 950 (with GM206 chip) launched with HDMI 2.0 support.

On May 6, 2016, Nvidia launched the GeForce GTX 1080 (GP104 GPU) with HDMI 2.0b support.

On September 1, 2020, Nvidia launched the GeForce RTX 30 series, the world's first discrete graphics cards with support for the full 48 Gbit/s bandwidth with Display Stream Compression 1.2 of HDMI 2.1.

=== Gaming consoles ===
Beginning with the seventh generation of video game consoles, most consoles support HDMI. Video game consoles that support HDMI include the Xbox 360 (except most pre-2007 models) (1.2a), Xbox One (1.4b), Xbox One S (2.0a), Xbox One X (2.0b), PlayStation 3 (1.3a), PlayStation 4 (1.4b), PlayStation 4 Pro (2.0a), Wii U (1.4a), Nintendo Switch (1.4b), Nintendo Switch (OLED model) (2.0a), Xbox Series X and Series S (2.1), PlayStation 5 (2.1), And Nintendo Switch 2 (2.1).

=== Tablet computers ===
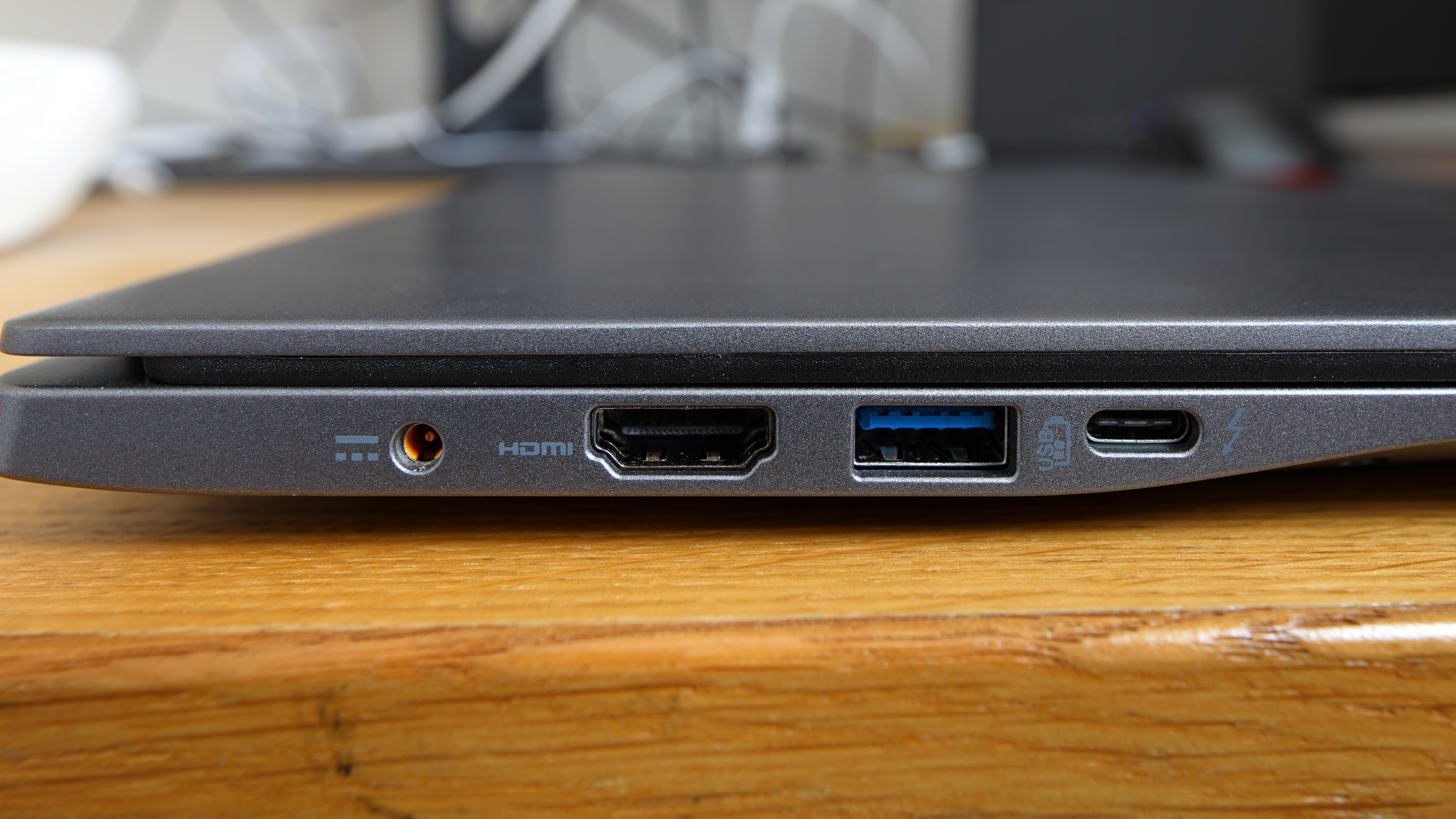
An HDMI port on the side of a laptop computer

Some tablet computers implement HDMI using Micro-HDMI (type D) port, while others like the Eee Pad Transformer implement the standard using mini-HDMI (type C) ports. All iPad models have a special A/V adapter that converts Apple's Lightning connector to a standard HDMI (type A) port. Samsung has a similar proprietary thirty-pin port for their Galaxy Tab 10.1 that could adapt to HDMI as well as USB drives. The Dell Streak 5 smartphone/tablet hybrid is capable of outputting over HDMI. While the Streak uses a PDMI port, a separate cradle adds HDMI compatibility. Some tablets running Android OS provide HDMI output using a mini-HDMI (type C) port. Most new laptops and desktops now have built in HDMI as well.

=== Mobile phones ===
Many mobile phones can produce an output of HDMI video via a micro-HDMI connector, SlimPort, MHL or other adapter.

=== Legacy compatibility ===
HDMI can only be used with older analog-only devices (using connections such as SCART, VGA, RCA, etc.) by means of a digital-to-analog converter or AV receiver, as the interface does not carry any analog signals (unlike DVI, where devices with DVI-I ports accept or provide either digital or analog signals). Cables are available that contain the necessary electronics, but it is important to distinguish these active converter cables from passive HDMI to VGA cables (which are typically cheaper as they don't include any electronics). The passive cables are only useful if a user has a device that is generating or expecting HDMI signals on a VGA connector, or VGA signals on an HDMI connector; this is a non-standard feature, not implemented by most devices.

== HDMI Alternate Mode for USB Type-C ==
The HDMI Alternate Mode for USB-C allows HDMI-enabled sources with a USB-C connector to directly connect to standard HDMI display devices, without requiring an adapter. The standard was released in September 2016, and supports all HDMI 1.4b features such as video resolutions up to Ultra HD 30 Hz and CEC. Previously, the similar DisplayPort Alternate Mode could be used to connect to HDMI displays from USB Type-C sources, but where in that case active adapters were required to convert from DisplayPort to HDMI, HDMI Alternate Mode connects to the display natively.

The Alternate Mode reconfigures the four SuperSpeed differential pairs present in USB-C to carry the three HDMI TMDS channels and the clock signal. The two Sideband Use pins (SBU1 and SBU2) are used to carry the HDMI Ethernet and Audio Return Channel and the Hot Plug Detect functionality (HEAC+/Utility pin and HEAC−/HPD pin). As there are not enough reconfigurable pins remaining in USB-C to accommodate the DDC clock (SCL), DDC data (SDA), and CEC – these three signals are bridged between the HDMI source and sink via the USB Power Delivery 2.0 (USB-PD) protocol, and are carried over the USB-C Configuration Channel (CC) wire. This is possible because the cable is electronically marked (i.e., it contains a USB PD node) that serves to tunnel the DDC and CEC from the source over the Configuration Channel to the node in the cable, these USB-PD messages are received and relayed to the HDMI sink as regenerated DDC (SCL and SDA signals), or CEC signals.

As stated at CES in January 2023, HDMI Alternate Mode for USB Type-C is no longer being updated as there are no known products using this protocol, reducing its relevance in the current market. This will reduce consumer confusion as DisplayPort Alternate Mode is the primary video protocol of choice over USB-C.

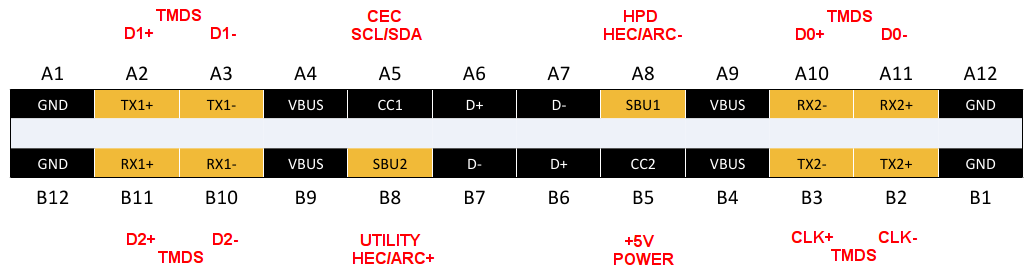
Pin mapping for USB Type-C HDMI Alternate Mode

== Relationship with DisplayPort ==
Dual-mode DisplayPort logo

The DisplayPort audio/video interface was introduced in May 2006 by the Video Electronics Standards Association (VESA). Historically, HDMI Licensing LLC was publicly dismissive of DisplayPort's position in the industry, with its president stating in a 2009 interview that "there are certainly some PCs that have DisplayPort connectors on them, but these are niche applications that have not taken hold in the market."

In recent years, DisplayPort connectors have become a common feature of premium products—displays, desktop computers, and video cards; most of the companies producing DisplayPort equipment are in the computer sector. The DisplayPort website states that DisplayPort is expected to complement HDMI, but as of 2016 100% of HD and UHD TVs had HDMI connectivity. DisplayPort supported some advanced features which are useful for multimedia content creators and gamers (e.g., 5K, Adaptive-Sync), which was the reason most GPUs have DisplayPort. These features were added to the official HDMI specification slightly later, but with the introduction of HDMI 2.1, these gaps are already leveled off (e.g., VRR / Variable Refresh Rate).

DisplayPort uses a self-clocking, micro-packet-based protocol that allows for a variable number of differential pair lanes as well as flexible allocation of bandwidth between audio and video, and allows encapsulating multi-channel compressed audio formats in the audio stream. DisplayPort 1.2 supports multiple audio/video streams, variable refresh rate (FreeSync), and Dual-mode transmitters compatible with HDMI 1.2 or 1.4. Revision 1.3 increases overall transmission bandwidth to 32.4 Gbit/s with the new HBR3 mode featuring 8.1 Gbit/s per lane; it requires Dual-mode with mandatory HDMI 2.0 compatibility and HDCP 2.2. Revision 1.4 added Display Stream Compression (DSC), support for the BT.2020 color space, and HDR10 extensions from CTA-861.3, including static and dynamic metadata. Revision 1.4a was published in April 2018, updating DisplayPort's DSC implementation from 1.2 to 1.2a. Revision 2.0 increased overall bandwidth from 25.92 to 77.37 Gbit/s, enabling increased resolutions and refresh rates, increasing the resolutions and refresh rates with HDR support, and other related improvements. Revision 2.1 was published in October 2022, incorporating the new DP40 and DP80 cable certifications, which require proper operation at the UHBR10 (40 Gbit/s) and UHBR20 (80 Gbit/s) speeds introduced in version 2.0, and a bandwidth management feature to enable DisplayPort tunnelling to coexist with other I/O data traffic more efficiently over a USB4/USB Type-C connection.

The DisplayPort features an adapter detection mechanism enabling dual-mode operation and the transmission of TMDS signals allowing the conversion to DVI and HDMI 1.2/1.4/2.0 signals using a passive adapter. The same external connector is used for both protocols – when a DVI/HDMI passive adapter is attached, the transmitter circuit switches to TMDS mode. DisplayPort Dual-mode ports and cables/adapters are typically marked with the DisplayPort++ logo. Thunderbolt ports with mDP connector also supports Dual-mode passive HDMI adapters/cables. Conversion to dual-link DVI and component video (VGA/YPbPr) requires active powered adapters.

The USB 3.1 type-C connector is increasingly the standard video connector, replacing legacy video connectors such as mDP, Thunderbolt, HDMI, and VGA in mobile devices. USB-C connectors can transmit DisplayPort video to docks and displays using standard USB type-C cables or type-C to DisplayPort cables and adapters; USB-C also supports HDMI adapters that actively convert from DisplayPort to HDMI 1.4 or 2.0. DisplayPort Alternate Mode for USB type-C specification was published in 2015. USB type-C chipsets are not required to include Dual-mode, so passive DP-HDMI adapters do not work with type-C sources. A specification for "HDMI Alternate Mode for USB type-C" was released in 2016, but was discontinued in 2023, with HDMI Licensing Administration stating they knew of no adapter having ever been produced.

DisplayPort is royalty-free, though patent pool administrator Via-LA attempts to collect a $0.20 per-device charge for a bulk license to patents it regards as essential to the DisplayPort specification, while HDMI has an annual fee of US$10,000 and a per unit royalty rate of between $0.04 and $0.15.

HDMI has had a few advantages over DisplayPort, such as ability to carry Consumer Electronics Control (CEC) signals since its first generation (DisplayPort 1.3, introduced in 2014, is the earliest DisplayPort generation which can carry CEC signals).

== Relationship with MHL ==
Mobile High-Definition Link (MHL) is an adaptation of HDMI intended to connect mobile devices such as smartphones and tablets to high-definition televisions (HDTVs) and displays. Unlike DVI, which is compatible with HDMI using only passive cables and adapters, MHL requires that the HDMI socket be MHL-enabled, otherwise an active adapter (or dongle) is required to convert the signal to HDMI. MHL is developed by a consortium of five consumer electronics manufacturers, several of which are also behind HDMI.

MHL pares down the three TMDS channels in a standard HDMI connection to a single one running over any connector that provides at least five pins. This lets existing connectors in mobile devices – such as micro-USB – be used, avoiding the need for additional dedicated video output sockets. The USB port switches to MHL mode when it detects a compatible device is connected.

In addition to the features in common with HDMI (such as HDCP encrypted uncompressed high-definition video and eight-channel surround sound), MHL also adds the provision of power charging for the mobile device while in use, and also enables the TV remote to control it. Although support for these additional features requires connection to an MHL-enabled HDMI port, power charging can also be provided when using active MHL to HDMI adapters (connected to standard HDMI ports), provided there is a separate power connection to the adapter.

Like HDMI, MHL defines a USB-C Alternate Mode to support the MHL standard over USB-C connections.

Version 1.0 supported 720p/1080i 60 Hz (RGB/4:4:4 pixel encoding) with a bandwidth of 2.25 Gbit/s. Versions 1.3 and 2.0 added support for 1080p 60 Hz (Y′C_{B}C_{R} 4:2:2) with a bandwidth of 3 Gbit/s in PackedPixel mode. Version 3.0 increased the bandwidth to 6 Gbit/s to support Ultra HD (3840 × 2160) 30 Hz video, and also changed from being frame-based, like HDMI, to packet-based.

The fourth version, superMHL, increased bandwidth by operating over multiple TMDS differential pairs (up to a total of six) allowing a maximum of 36 Gbit/s. The six lanes are supported over a reversible 32-pin superMHL connector, while four lanes are supported over USB-C Alternate Mode (only a single lane is supported over micro-USB/HDMI). Display Stream Compression (DSC) is used to allow up to 8K Ultra HD (7680 × 4320) 120 Hz HDR video, and to support Ultra HD 60 Hz video over a single lane.

== HDMI Forum ==
On October 25, 2011, the HDMI Forum was established by the HDMI founders to create an open, nonprofit industry consortium so that interested companies can participate in the development of the HDMI specification.

All members of the HDMI Forum have equal voting rights, may participate in the Technical Working Group, and if elected can be on the Board of Directors. There is no limit to the number of companies allowed in the HDMI Forum though companies must pay an annual fee of US$12,500 with an additional annual fee of $5,000 for those companies that serve on the Board of Directors. The Board of Directors is made up of 12 companies who are elected every two years by a general vote of HDMI Forum members.

All future developments of the HDMI specification take place in the HDMI Forum and are built upon the HDMI 1.4b specification.

== See also ==
- List of display interfaces
- DisplayPort
- GPMI
- Serial digital interface
- Thunderbolt (interface)
- USB-C
- Wireless HDMI
