= HDCP repeater bit =

Feature of the HDMI cable

The HDCP repeater bit (Bit Field 0 in "Table 4.4 RxCaps Register Bit Field Definitions" p58 of the HDCP Specification rev2.3) is a part of the High-bandwidth Digital Content Protection specification and applies to intermediate devices (HDCP Repeaters) between the Source device and the Presentation device. For example, a Blu-ray connected by HDMI to an AV Receiver which in turn is connected to a TV using HDMI makes the AV Receiver an HDCP Repeater. The AV Receiver reports to the Transmitter whether it is a Repeater or a Receiver (no downstream devices) using the REPEATER bit.

== Details ==
Following the above example the AV Receiver must report whether it has downstream devices or not using the REPEATER bit. E.g. when the TV is turned on, the AV Receiver should set REPEATER=TRUE, and when TV is turned off it sets REPEATER=FALSE. Since there is no proper way to notify on REPEATER status change, the AV Receiver must reset the connection with the Source. In order to avoid this redundant reset cycles on the connections, which has annoying user-experience, HDCP v1.x allows devices that are potentially Repeater to set the REPEATER all the time, even when no downstream devices are connected (e.g. while the TV is off). In HDCP v2.x that smart has been lost and the Repeater must not keep the REPEATER flag set once it has no downstream devices.

The repeater bit is a part of the HDCPv1 and HDCPv2 specifications, which is available on the digital content protection LLC web site. The specification defines repeater devices:

HDCP Repeater. An HDCP device that can receive and decrypt HDCP content through one or more of its HDCP-protected interface ports, and can also re-encrypt and emit said HDCP content through one or more of its HDCP-protected interface ports, is referred to as an HDCP repeater. An HDCP repeater may also be referred to as either an HDCP receiver or an HDCP transmitter when referring to either the upstream side or the downstream side, respectively.

== Issues with REPEATER ==
Some HDCPv1.x devices (usually old) may not agree to work with Repeater that has REPEATER=TRUE but not downstream devices (DEVICE_COUNT=0). Turning off a TV may reset the entire HDMI tree of devices (in some constellations it could be many devices) due to reset of the REPEATER flag.

== See also ==
- High-Definition Multimedia Interface (HDMI)
- Digital Visual Interface (DVI)
- High-bandwidth Digital Content Protection (HDCP)
