= SDVoE =

System for transferring multimedia over IP-based networks

Software Defined Video over Ethernet
- Communication protocol
- Abbreviation: SDVoE
- Purpose: Streaming Multimedia (Video, Audio, USB, Control)
- Developer(s): SDVoE Alliance
- Introduction
- Based on: IP multicasting, IGMP, PVP
- OSI layer: Transport (4), Session (5), Presentation (6)
- IP number: Packet Video Protocol (#75)
- Port(s): 80, 443, 1900, 6137, 6970, 6971, 6973, 6969, 10001–10004

SDVoE (Software Defined Video over Ethernet) is an open standard & specification AV-over-IP protocol-suite, for versatile real-time streaming of media (including video, audio, control signals, USB) over IP packet-switched data networks, using IP multicasting and Packet Video Protocol.

== See also ==
- HDBaseT
