= VESA Digital Flat Panel =

DFP
- Type: Digital video connector

Production history
- Designer: Video Electronics Standards Association
- Designed: February 14, 1999
- Superseded: VGA connector
- Superseded by: Digital Visual Interface

General specifications
- Pins: 20

Data
- Data signal: PanelLink protocol Transition Minimized Differential Signaling
- Width: 3 bits plus clock
- Max. devices: 1
- Protocol: PanelLink (Serial)

Pinout
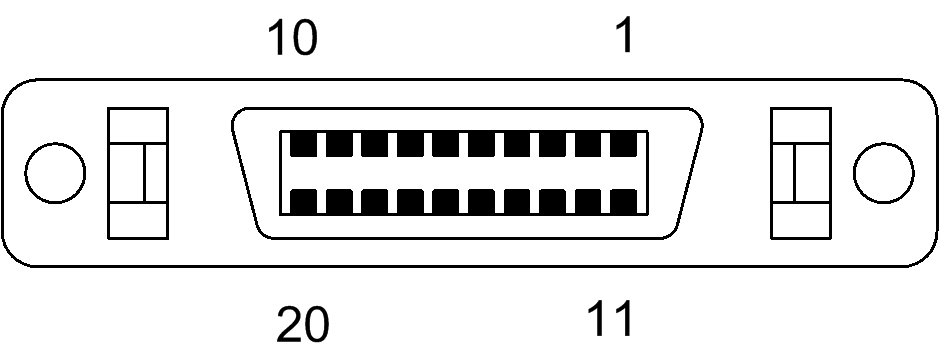
- Pin 1: TMDS data 1 +
- Pin 2: TMDS data 1 –
- Pin 3: GND
- Pin 4: GND
- Pin 5: TMDS data C +
- Pin 6: TMDS data C –
- Pin 7: GND
- Pin 8: +5 V
- Pin 9: Reserved
- Pin 10: Reserved
- Pin 11: TMDS data 2 +
- Pin 12: TMDS data 2 –
- Pin 13: GND
- Pin 14: GND
- Pin 15: TMDS data 0 +
- Pin 16: TMDS data 0 –
- Pin 17: Reserved
- Pin 18: Reserved
- Pin 19: DDC data
- Pin 20: DDC clock

The VESA Digital Flat Panel (DFP) interface standard specifies a video connector and digital TMDS signaling for flat-panel displays. It features 20 pins and uses the PanelLink protocol; the standard is based on the preceding VESA Plug and Display (P&D) standard, ratified in 1997. Unlike the later, electrically-compatible Digital Visual Interface (DVI, 1999), DFP never achieved widespread implementation.

== History ==
P&D combined analog and digital video with data over USB and FireWire to reduce cable clutter, but the feature creep resulted in an unpopular, expensive connector. Compaq described DFP as a "transition" step between the analog VGA connector and P&D: DFP was designed by a consortium including Compaq, Hewlett-Packard, and ATI Technologies as a smaller, simpler connector, dropping support for analog video and data in favor of transmitting exclusively digital video signals.

The connector was used by displays such as the Compaq Presario FP400, FP500, FP700, Fp720, 5204, and 5280. It was offered on graphics cards such as the Xpert LCD, and Rage LT Pro by ATI Technologies, and the Oxygen GVX1 by 3Dlabs.

== Design ==
DFP is compatible electrically with P&D (and by extension, DVI); DFP uses the Display Data Channel (DDC) standard level DDC2B for operation and the Extended Display Identification Data (EDID) protocol to identify the display to the host. Like the preceding P&D, DFP uses the PanelLink TMDS protocol developed by Silicon Image for digital video signals.

The DFP standard specifies a 20-pin mini D ribbon connector; however, as the signal protocols are identical, DFP connectors generally are compatible with devices equipped with a DVI interface by using a passive adaptor.

All DFP-compliant devices are required to support resolutions of 640×400, 720×400, and 640×480 (each at a refresh rate of 60 Hz) as a minimum level of interoperability, although the resulting display may not necessarily be centered or scaled.

DFP was superseded by DVI because DFP, like P&D, is limited to a single-link TMDS signal. In contrast, DVI is capable of higher maximum resolutions because it supports a dual-link TMDS signal; in addition, DVI also supports analog video, which makes the VGA connector redundant.

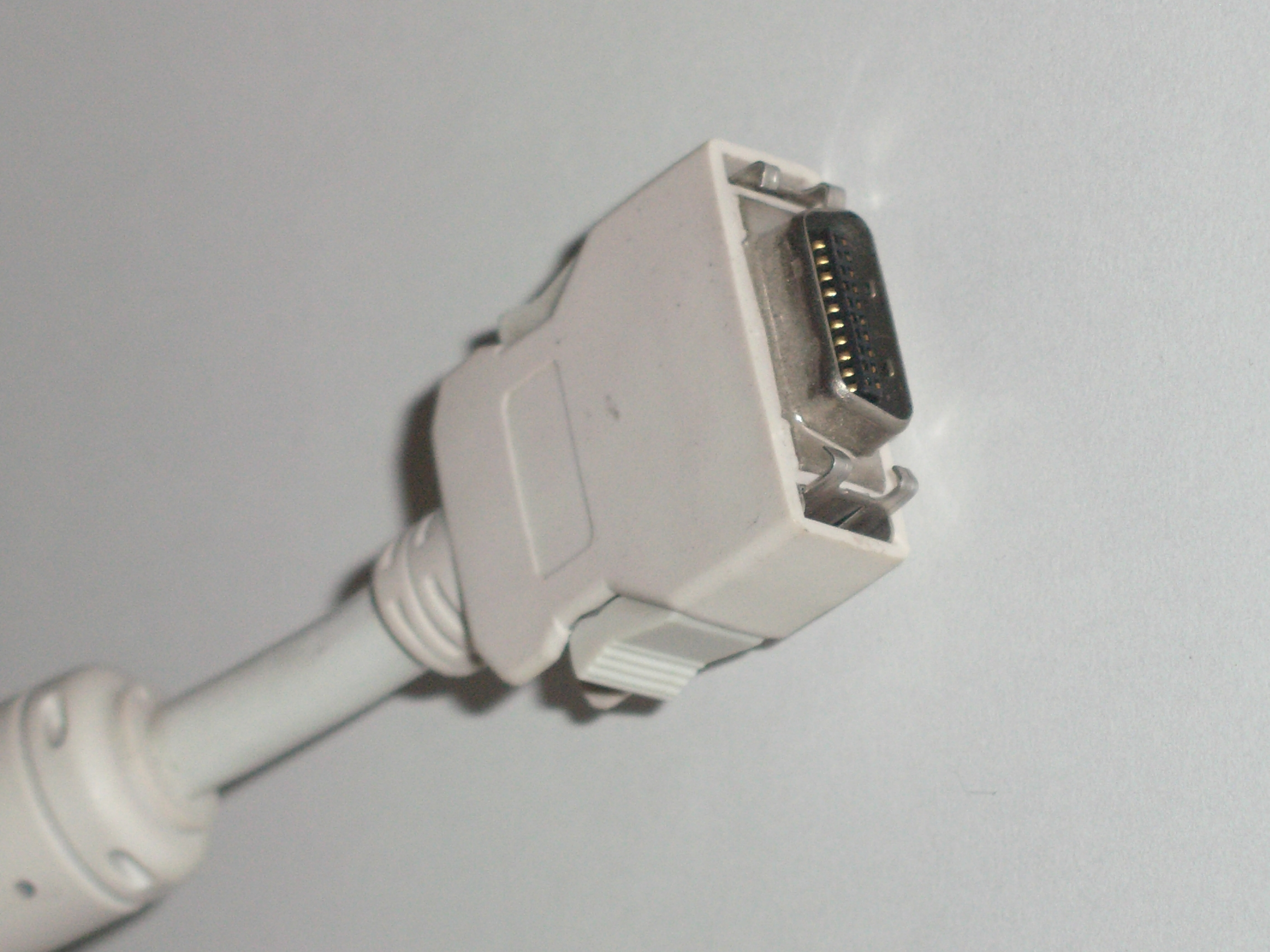
male DFP connector

female DFP connector

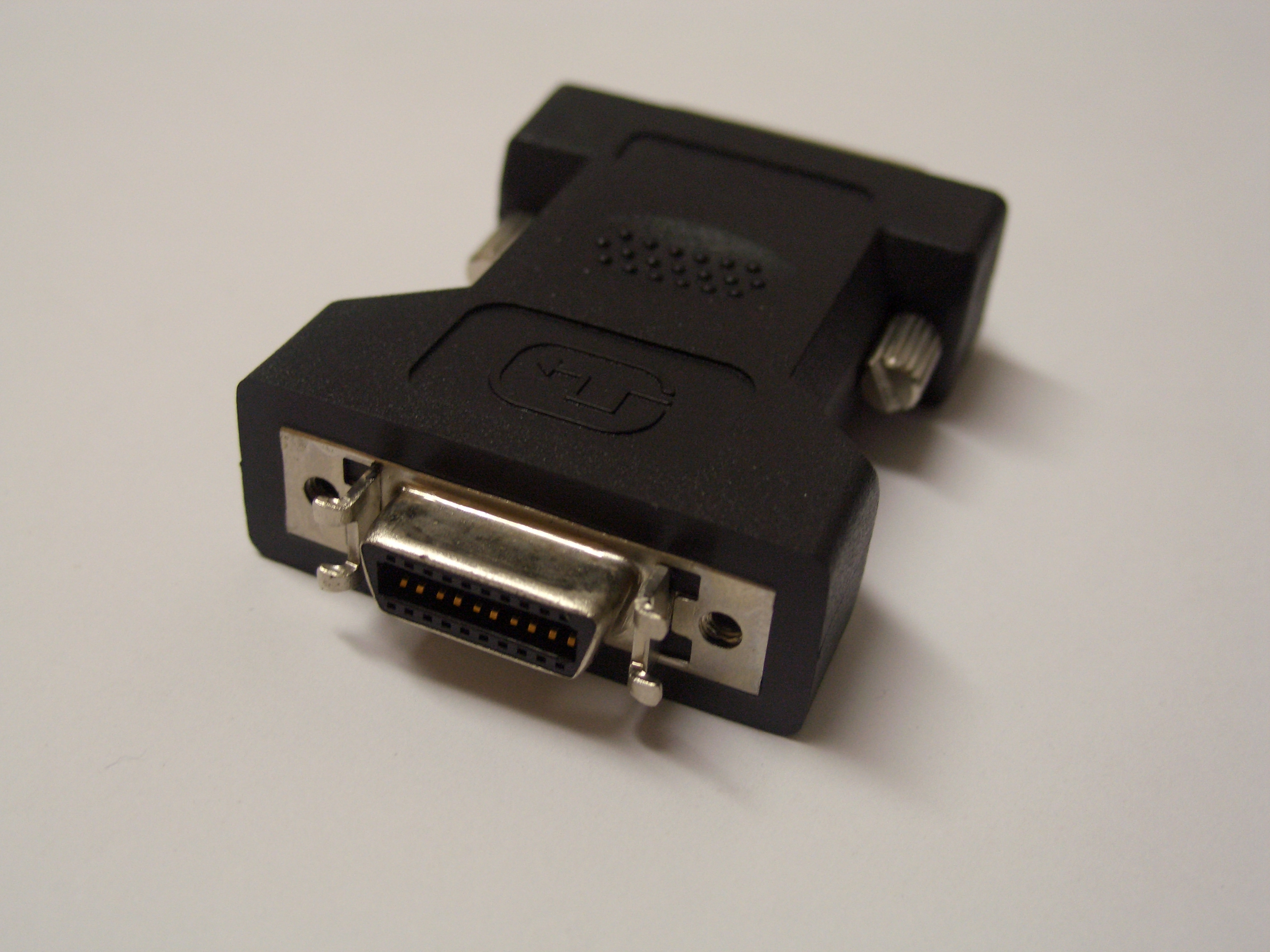
DVI-DFP adaptor
