= DDWG =

DDWG may refer to:

- Digital Display Working Group, an industry consortium that developed the DVI standard.
- W3C Device Description Working Group, a part of the W3C Mobile Web Initiative.
