= VESA Plug and Display =

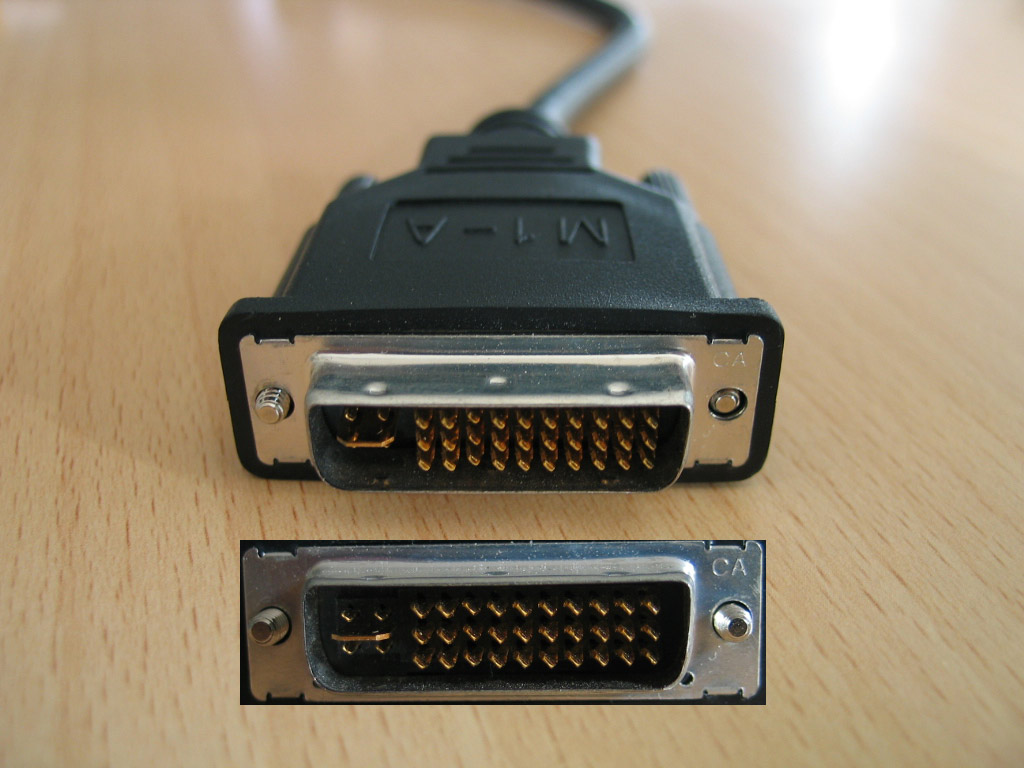
M1-P&D Plug

VESA Plug and Display (abbreviated as P&D) is a video connector that carries digital signals for monitors, such as flat panel displays and video projectors, ratified by Video Electronics Standards Association (VESA) in 1997. Introduced around the same time as the competing connectors for the Digital Visual Interface (DVI, 1999) and VESA's own Digital Flat Panel (DFP, 1999), it was marketed as a replacement for the VESA Enhanced Video Connector (EVC, 1994). Unlike DVI, it never achieved widespread implementation.

The P&D connector shares the 30-pin plus quad-coax layout of EVC, which carries digital video, analog video, and data over Universal Serial Bus (USB) and IEEE 1394 (FireWire). At a minimum, the P&D connector is required to carry digital video, in which case the connector is designated P&D-D; when both digital and analog video are included, the connector is designated P&D-A/D.

== Design ==
VESA Plug and Display symbol
Mark	Meaning	Mark	Meaning
A1	RS-170	D	Non-standard
A2	RS-343	D1	25–65 MHz
A3	Euro	D2	65–112 MHz
A4	VESA	D3	112–160 MHz
IEEE	Supports IEEE 1394-1995	USB	Supports USB
(none)	No IEEE 1394 support	(none)	No USB support

The P&D receptacle and plug are required to bear a standardized symbol to designate the standards with which it is compatible. The upper left quadrant designates analog video support. The upper right quadrant designates digital video support. The lower quadrants designate IEEE 1394 and USB support.

All P&D connectors are required to carry single-link TMDS digital video signal (max 160 MHz), and support VESA Display Data Channel version 2 at a minimum. Maximum resolution is 1600×1280 with a 60 Hz refresh rate.

Analogue video signals, if supported, must be provided as three separate color channels (red / green / blue) along with one composite or two (horizontal & vertical) sync signals. The nominal impedance of each signal line is 75 Ω and each channel must be capable of carrying a bandwidth of at least 2.4 GHz. The type designation for the analogue video signals designates the voltage values of the signals only, including the Type 4 (VESA) analog DC protocol introduced with EVC:

P&D analog video signal levels
Signal	Type 1 RS-170	Type 2 RS-343	Type 3 Euro	Type 4 VESA
Peak	+1.000 V	+0.714 V	+0.700 V	+0.700 VDC
Minimum	+0.075 V	+0.054 V	+0.000 V	+0.000 VDC
Blank	Reference	Reference	Reference	+0.000 VDC
Sync. tip	-0.400 V	-0.286 V	-0.300 V	None

The P&D connector supports optional charging power at 18–20 VDC and up to 1.5 A. In addition, a stereoscopic display synchronization signal is supported as an option. Data signals over USB and FireWire also are optional.

USB version is not specified, but if supported, it would have been intended for contemporary USB standards. The USB connector is intended for passing mouse movements from a projector's wireless remote to the computer's presentation software and for firmware upgrades.

FireWire, if supported, must be compliant to IEEE 1394-1995 specification.

=== Connectors ===
Although the pin layout is copied from VESA EVC, the connector shell is slightly different: EVC uses a trapezoid shape, while P&D uses a D-shape. The interface is protected by patents issued to Molex. With the introduction of P&D, EVC continued as the connector for analog-only signals and is sometimes known as P&D-A; the EVC/P&D family was completed with combination analog/digital (P&D-A/D) and digital-only (P&D-D) connectors. P&D-A/D is compatible with EVC devices (except for the missing VESA EVC features), P&D-D is not.

P&D and EVC interoperability
Host (receptacle) Monitor (plug)	EVC (Note: For this table, it is assumed EVC is the analog-only implementation)	P&D-A/D	P&D-D
EVC	Yes	Yes	No
P&D-D	No	Yes	Yes

Notes

In addition to the regular P&D connector, the standard also specifies a 40-pin microribbon connector, which is only defined when making digital video connection via P&D-D.

The P&D port is sometimes mistaken as an alternative form of the Apple Display Connector, but ADC carries higher current, has different pin layout, and does not support FireWire.

VESA P&D receptacle pinouts
Pin	Function	P&D-A/D	P&D-D
1	General purpose, third make	TMDS Data2 +	
2	General purpose, third make	TMDS Data2 -	
3	General purpose, third make	TMDS Data2 return	
4	General purpose, third make	Horizontal & Vertical sync return	Not used
5	General purpose, third make	Horizontal sync / Composite sync	Not used
6	General purpose, third make	Vertical sync	Not used
7	General purpose, third make	TMDS Clock return	
8	General purpose, fourth make	Charge power +	
9	General purpose, third make	1394 pair A, data -	
10	General purpose, third make	1394 pair A, data +	
11	General purpose, third make	TMDS Data1 +	
12	General purpose, third make	TMDS Data1 -	
13	General purpose, third make	TMDS Data1 return	
14	General purpose, third make	TMDS Clock +	
15	General purpose, third make	TMDS Clock -	
16	General purpose, third make	USB data +	
17	General purpose, third make	USB data -	
18	General purpose, fourth make	1394 outer shield (optional) & Charge Power return	
19	General purpose, third make	1394 Vg	
20	General purpose, third make	1394 Vp	
21	General purpose, third make	TMDS Data0 +	
22	General purpose, third make	TMDS Data0 -	
23	General purpose, third make	TMDS Data0 return	
24	General purpose, third make	Stereo sync	Not used
25	General purpose, third make	DDC return & Stereo sync return	
26	General purpose, third make	DDC data (SDA)	
27	General purpose, third make	DDC clock (SCL)	
28	General purpose, fourth make	+5 VDC	
29	General purpose, third make	1394 pair B, Clock +	
30	General purpose, third make	1394 pair B, Clock -	
C1	Quasi-Coaxial, fourth make	Red Video Out	Not used
C2	Quasi-Coaxial, fourth make	Green Video Out	Not used
C3	Quasi-Coaxial, fourth make	Pixel clock (optional)	Not used
C4	Quasi-Coaxial, fourth make	Blue Video Out	Not used
C5	Common ground for quasi-coaxial lines, second make	Video / Pixel Clock Return	Used as mechanical key

== Alternative names ==
- M1-DA, a name used by InFocus (often shortened to M1)
