= ATI Rage =

Series of video cards

ATI Rage series
- Release date: 1996; 30 years ago
- Discontinued: Yes (official support)
- Codename: Rage
- Architecture: Rage

Cards
- Entry-level: 3D Rage, 3D Rage II, XL, Pro
- Mid-range: 128 VR, 128 GL
- High-end: 128 Pro
- Enthusiast: Fury MAXX

API support
- OpenGL: OpenGL 1.0

History
- Predecessor: Mach series
- Successor: Radeon 7000 series

Support status
- Unsupported

The ATI Rage (stylized as RAGE or rage) is a series of graphics chipsets developed by ATI Technologies offering graphical user interface (GUI) 2D acceleration, video acceleration, and 3D acceleration. It is the successor to the ATI Mach series of 2D accelerators.

== 3D RAGE (I) ==
The original 3D RAGE (also known as Mach64 GT) chip was based upon a Mach64 2D core with new 3D functionality and MPEG-1 acceleration. The 3D RAGE was released in April 1996. The 3D RAGE was used in ATI's 3D Xpression video board. Additionally, this chip was found integrated into the IBM Aptiva 2176 line with the Stealth case, and came with a Free Copy of MechWarrior 2: 31st Century Combat that only worked with this graphics chip to showcase its abilities. The memory configuration on this integrated chip was 2 Megabytes.

== 3D RAGE II (II+, II+DVD, IIc) ==
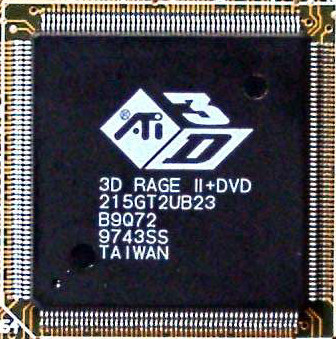
ATI Rage II+DVD chip

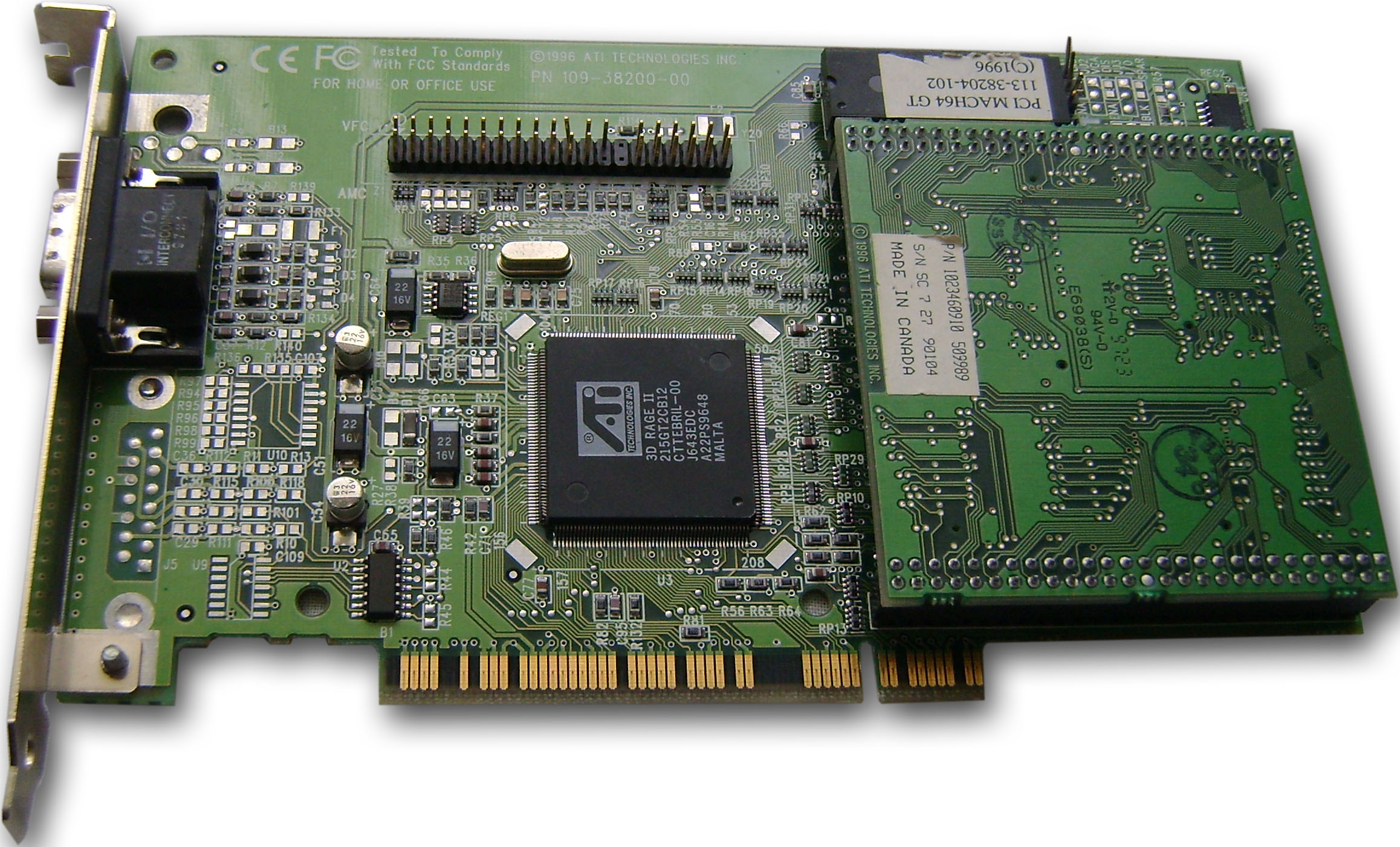
ATI 3D Rage II Graphics Card

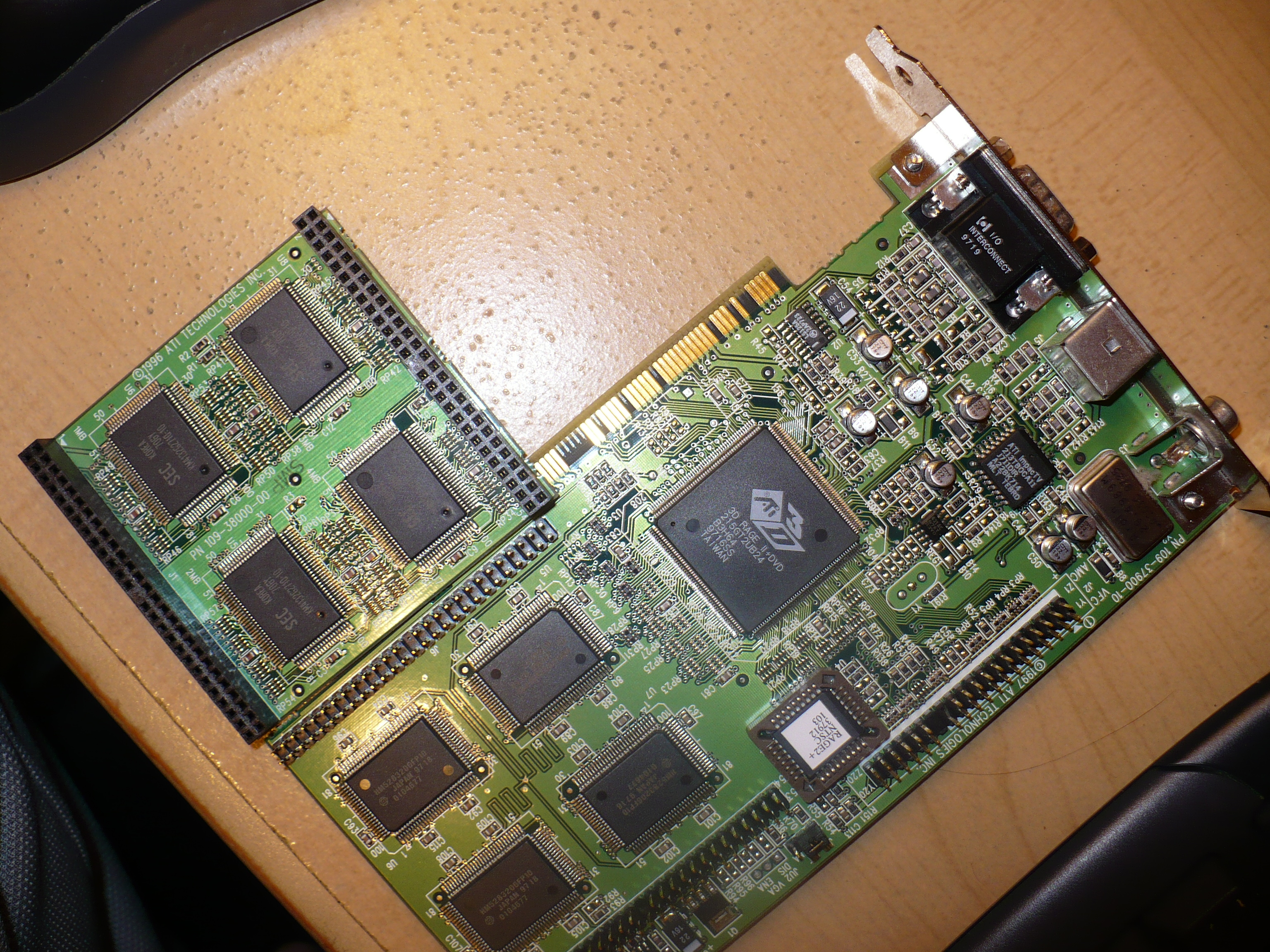
ATI 3D Rage II+ DVD with Vertex M1 panel removed

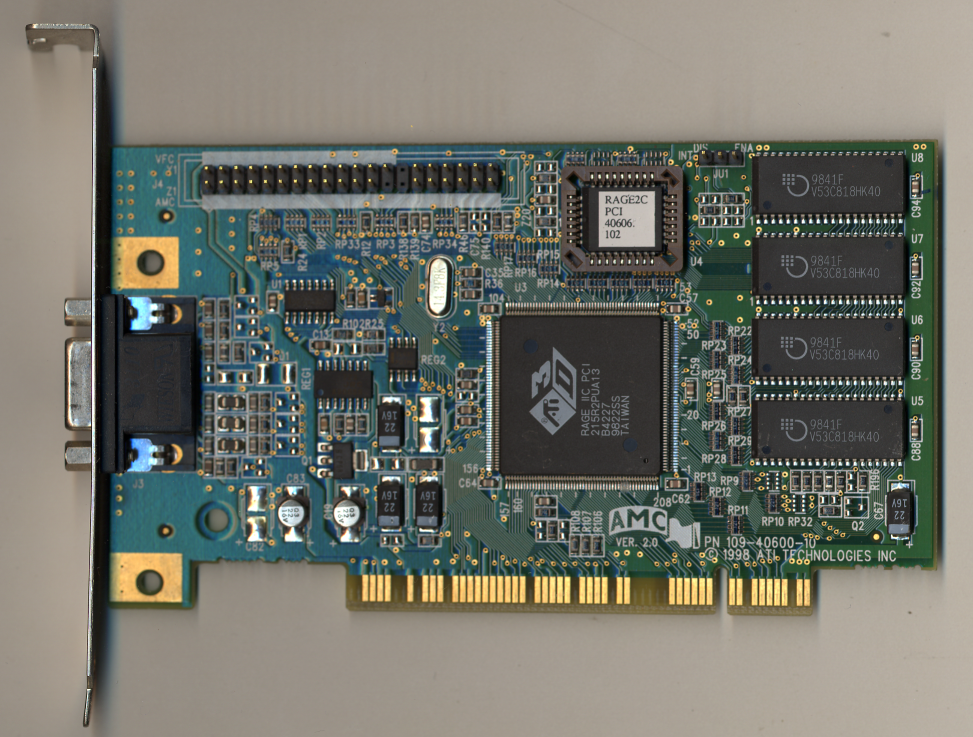
ATI Rage IIc PCI card

The second generation Rage (aka Mach64 GT-B) offered roughly two times greater 3D performance. Its graphics processor was based again on a re-engineered Mach64 GUI engine that provided optimal 2D performance with either single-cycle EDO memory or high-speed SGRAM. The 3D Rage II chip was an enhanced, pin compatible version of the 3D Rage accelerator. The second-generation PCI-bus compatible chip boosted 2D performance by 20 percent and added support for MPEG-2 (DVD) playback. The chip also had driver support for Microsoft Direct3D and Reality Lab, QuickDraw 3D Rave, Criterion RenderWare, and Argonaut BRender. OpenGL drivers are available for the professional 3D and CAD community and Heidi drivers are available for AutoCAD users. Drivers were also provided in operating systems including Windows 95, Windows NT, the Mac OS, OS/2, and Linux. ATI also shipped a TV encoder companion chip for RAGE II, the ImpacTV chip.

RAGE II was integrated into several Macintosh Computers, including the first revision of the Power Macintosh G3 (Beige) and the Power Mac 6500. In IBM-compatible PCs, several motherboards and video cards used the chipset as well including: the 3D Xpression+, the 3D Pro Turbo, and the original All-in-Wonder.

The 3D Rage IIc was the last version of the Rage II core and offered optional AGP support. The Rage IIc was used in the original iMac (Revision A) in 1998.

- Specifications for the Rage II+DVD:
  - 60 MHz core
  - up to 83 MHz SGRAM memory
  - 480 MB/s memory bandwidth
  - Direct3D 5.0

== 3D RAGE Pro ==
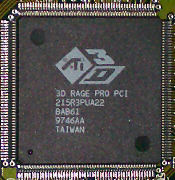
RAGE Pro chip

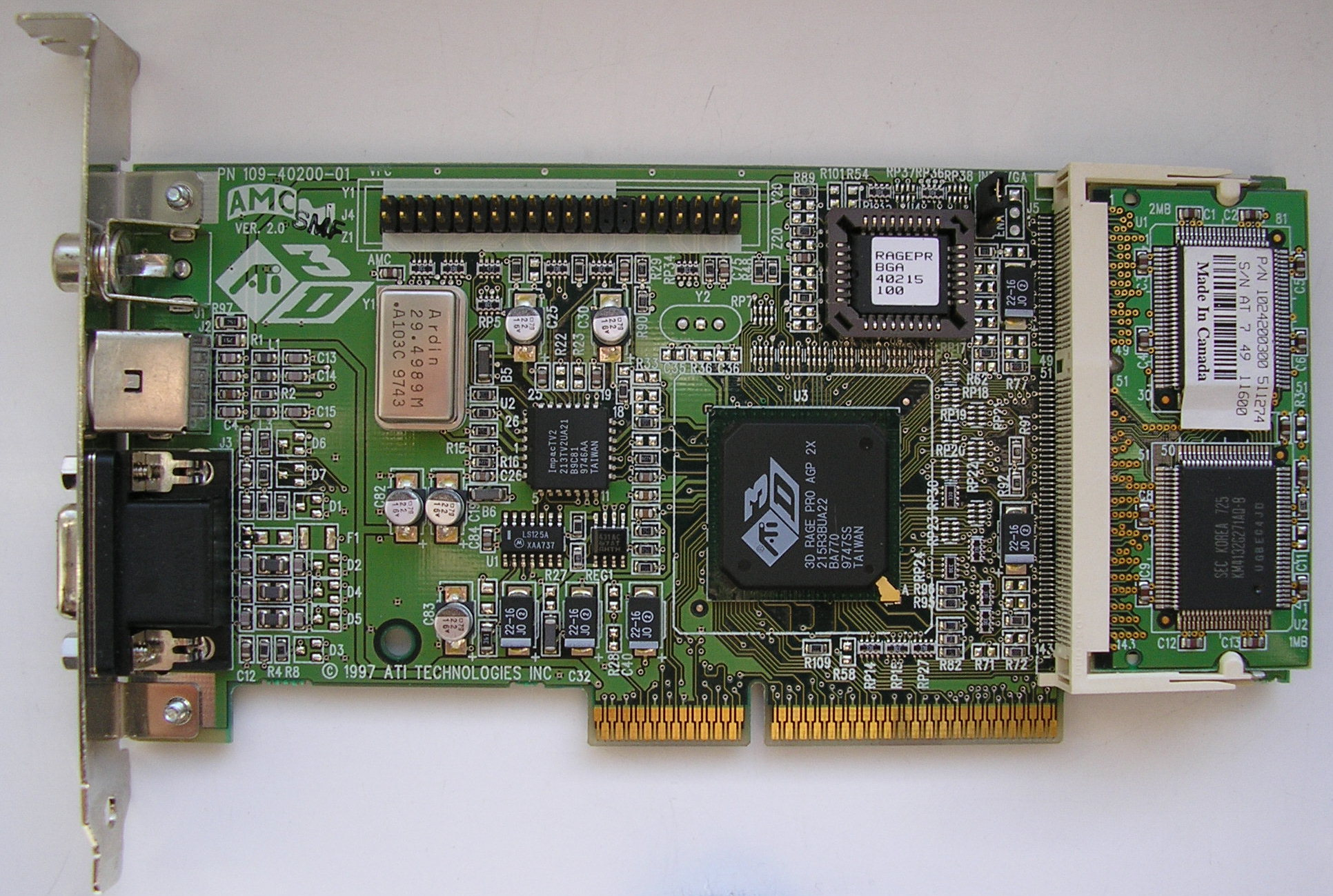
ATI Xpert@Play, AGP, 8 MB RAM

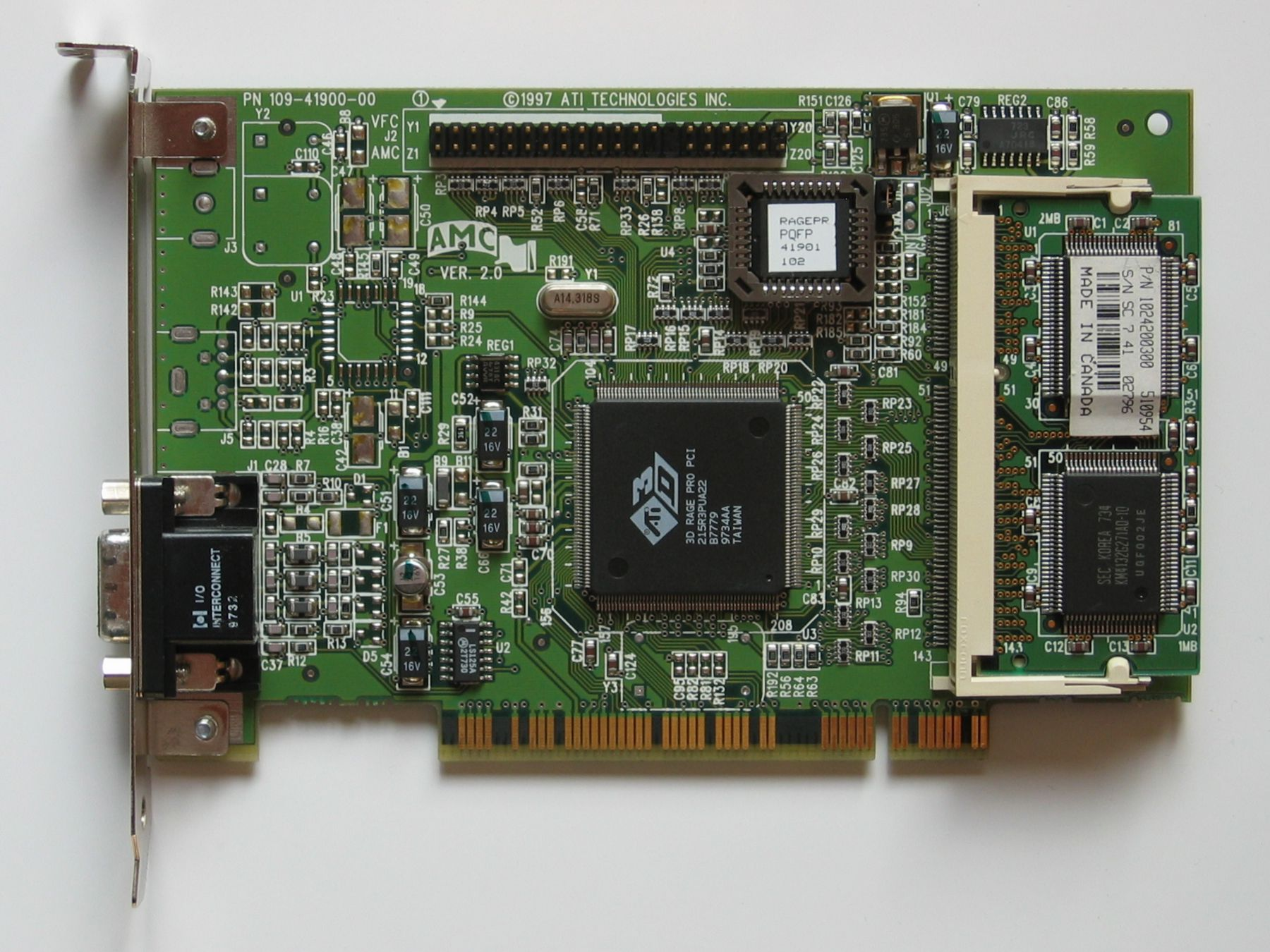
ATI Xpert@Work, PCI, 8 MB RAM

ATI made a number of changes over the 3D RAGE II: a new triangle setup engine, perspective correction improvements, fog support and transparency implementations, specular lighting support, and enhanced video playback and DVD support. The 3D Rage Pro chip was designed for Intel's Accelerated Graphics Port (AGP), taking advantage of execute-mode texturing, command pipelining, sideband addressing, and full 2×-mode protocols. Initial versions relied on standard graphics memory configurations: up to 8 MiB of SGRAM or 16 MB of WRAM, depending on the model.

RAGE Pro offered performance in the range of Nvidia's RIVA 128 and 3dfx's Voodoo accelerator, but generally failed to match or exceed its competitors. This, in addition to its (early) lack of OpenGL support, hurt sales for what was touted to be a solid game renderer.

In February 1998, ATI introduced the 2× AGP version of the Rage Pro to the OEM market and attempted to reinvent the Rage Pro for the retail market, by simultaneously renaming the chip to Rage Pro Turbo, and releasing a new Rage Pro Turbo driver-set (4.10.2312) that supposedly increased performance by 40%. In reality, early versions of the new driver only delivered increased performance in benchmarks such as Ziff-Davis' 3D Winbench 98 and Final Reality. In games, however, performance actually suffered. Despite its poor introduction, the Rage Pro Turbo name stuck, and ATI was able to release updated versions of the driver that granted visible performance increases in games, however this was still not enough to garner much interest from PC enthusiasts.

The 3D Rage Pro was mainly sold in the retail market as the Xpert@Work or the Xpert@Play, with the only difference being a TV-out port on the Xpert@Play version. It was also the built-in graphic chipset in the Sun Ultra 5/10 workstations, their first computer model to offer commodity PC hardware components, as well as the built-in graphic chipset of the second revision of the Power Macintosh G3 (Beige). The 3D Rage Pro Turbo was also used in later revisions of the original iMac, namely Revision B and C.

- General Specifications for the 3D Rage Pro:
  - 75 MHz core
  - 4, 8, and 16 MB 100 MHz SGRAM/WRAM memory
  - 800 MB/s memory bandwidth
  - Direct3D 6.0

== RAGE LT (laptop) and RAGE LT Pro (desktop) ==
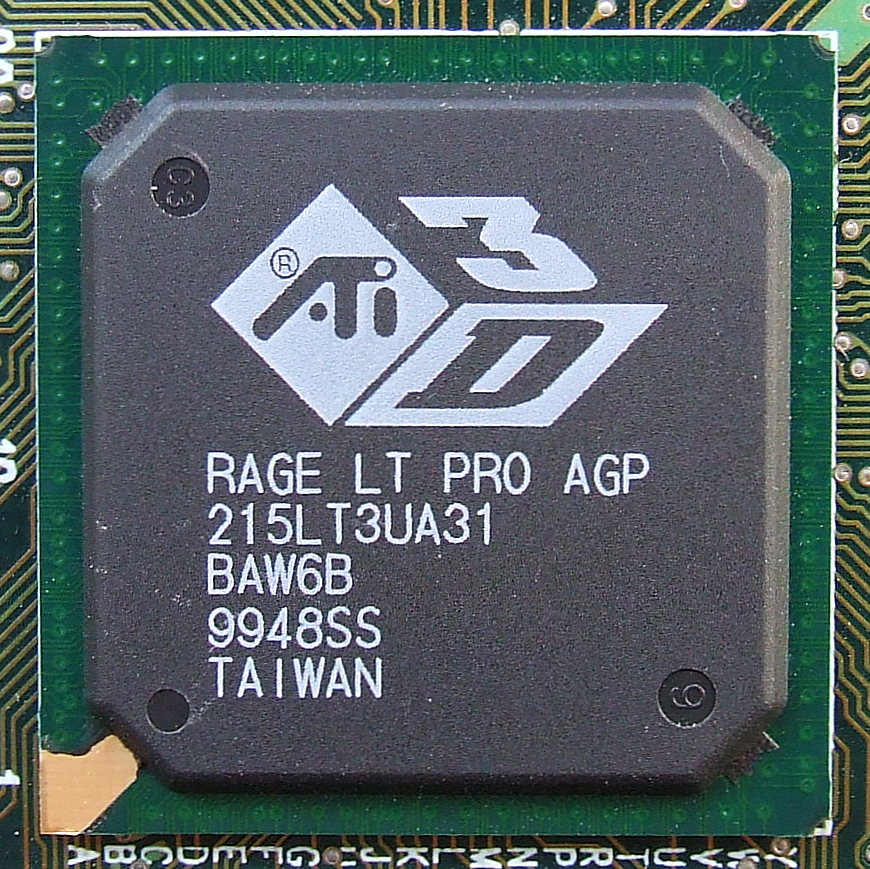
Rage LT chip

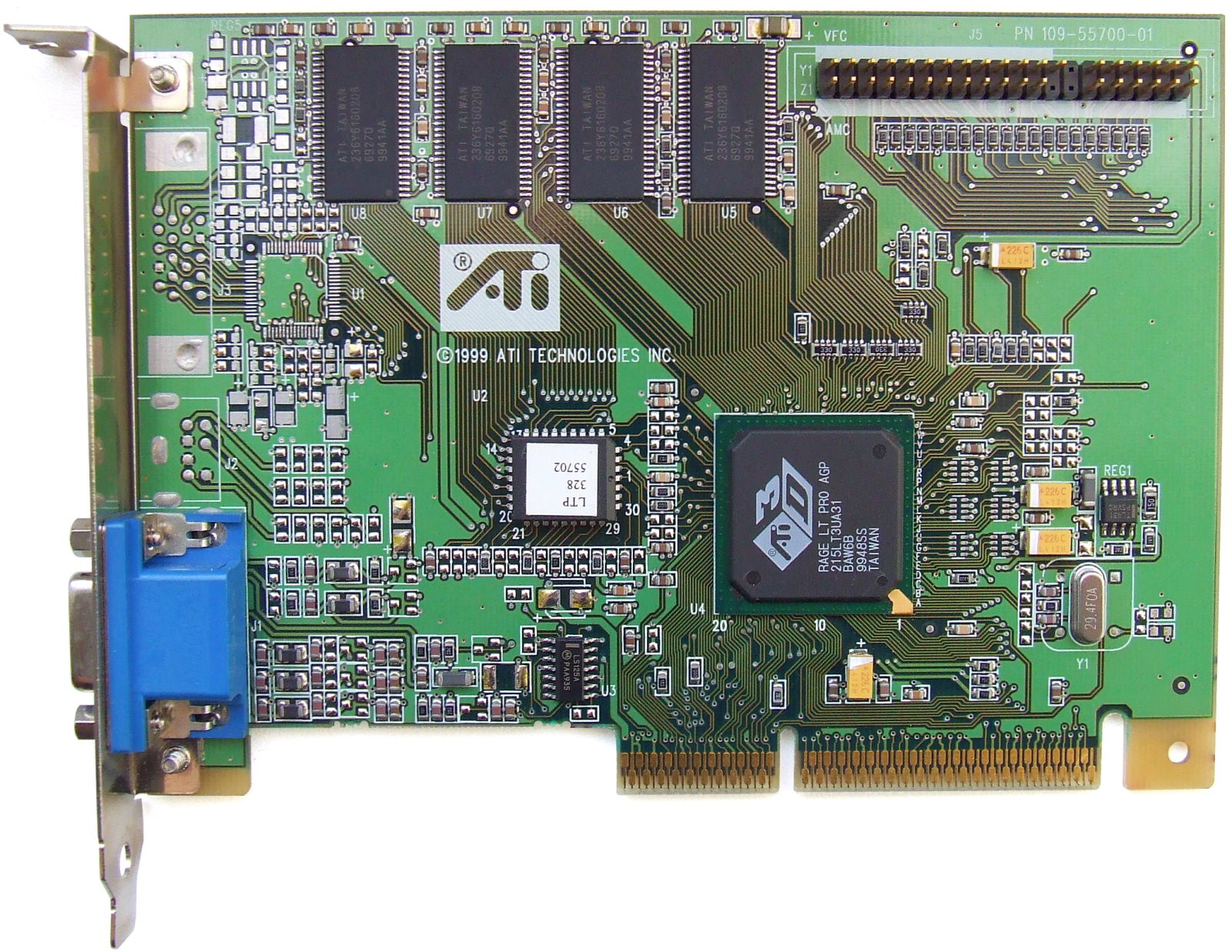
ATI Rage LT Pro AGP, 8 MB SDRAM

Rage LT or Mach64 LT was often implemented on motherboards and in mobile applications like notebook computers. This late 1996 chip was very similar to the Rage II and supported the same application coding. It integrated a low-voltage differential signaling (LVDS) transmitter for notebook LCDs and advanced power management (block-by-block power control). The RAGE LT PRO, based on the 3D RAGE PRO, was the very first mobile GPU to use AGP.

It offered Filtered Ratiometric Expansion, which automatically adjusted images to full-screen size. ATI's ImpacTV2+ is integrated with the RAGE LT PRO chip to support multi-screen viewing; i.e., simultaneous outputs to TV, CRT and LCD. In addition, the RAGE LT PRO can drive two displays with different images and/or refresh rates with the use of integrated dual, independent CRT controllers.

The Rage LT Pro was often used in desktop video cards that had a VESA Digital Flat Panel port to drive some desktop LCD monitors digitally.

After ATI stopped producing the RAGE LT, ATI used the Rage 128 and Rage 128 Pro as the base chip for their new Mobility Mobile Graphics.

== RAGE XL ==
The Rage XL was a low-cost RAGE Pro-based card. As a low-power chip with capable 2D & 3D acceleration, the Rage XL was used on many low-end graphics cards. It was also seen on Intel motherboards as recently as 2004, and was still used in 2006 for server motherboards. The Rage XL has been succeeded by the ATI ES1000 for server use.

The chip was basically a die-shrunk Rage Pro, optimized to be very inexpensive for applications where only basic graphics output was necessary.

Rage XL has improved bilinear filtering on transparent textures compared to the Rage Pro.

== RAGE 128 ==
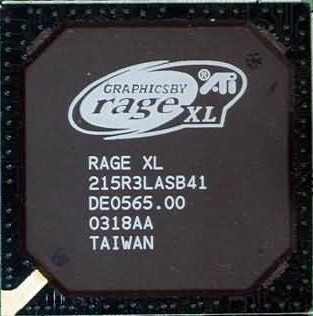
Rage XL chip

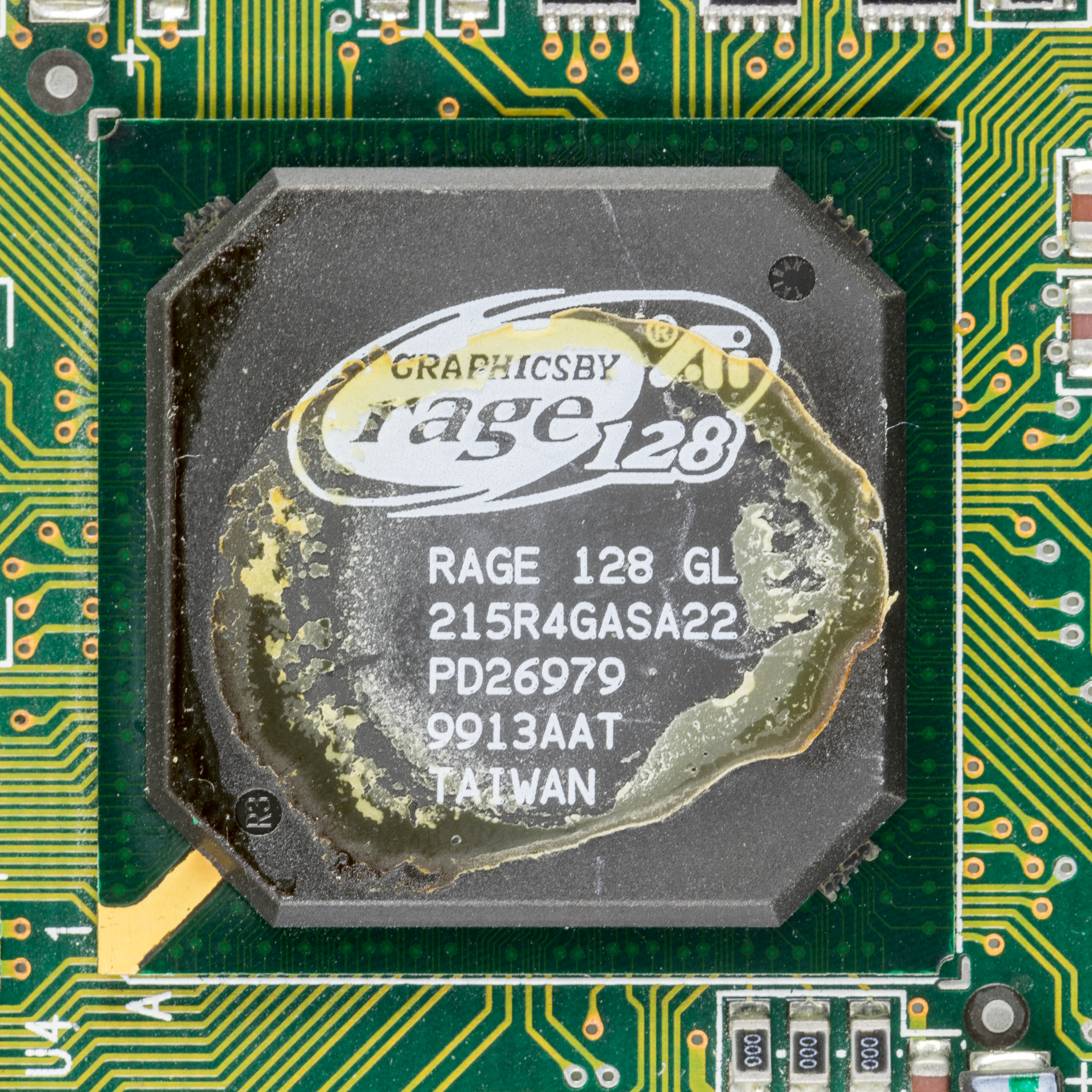
Rage 128 chip

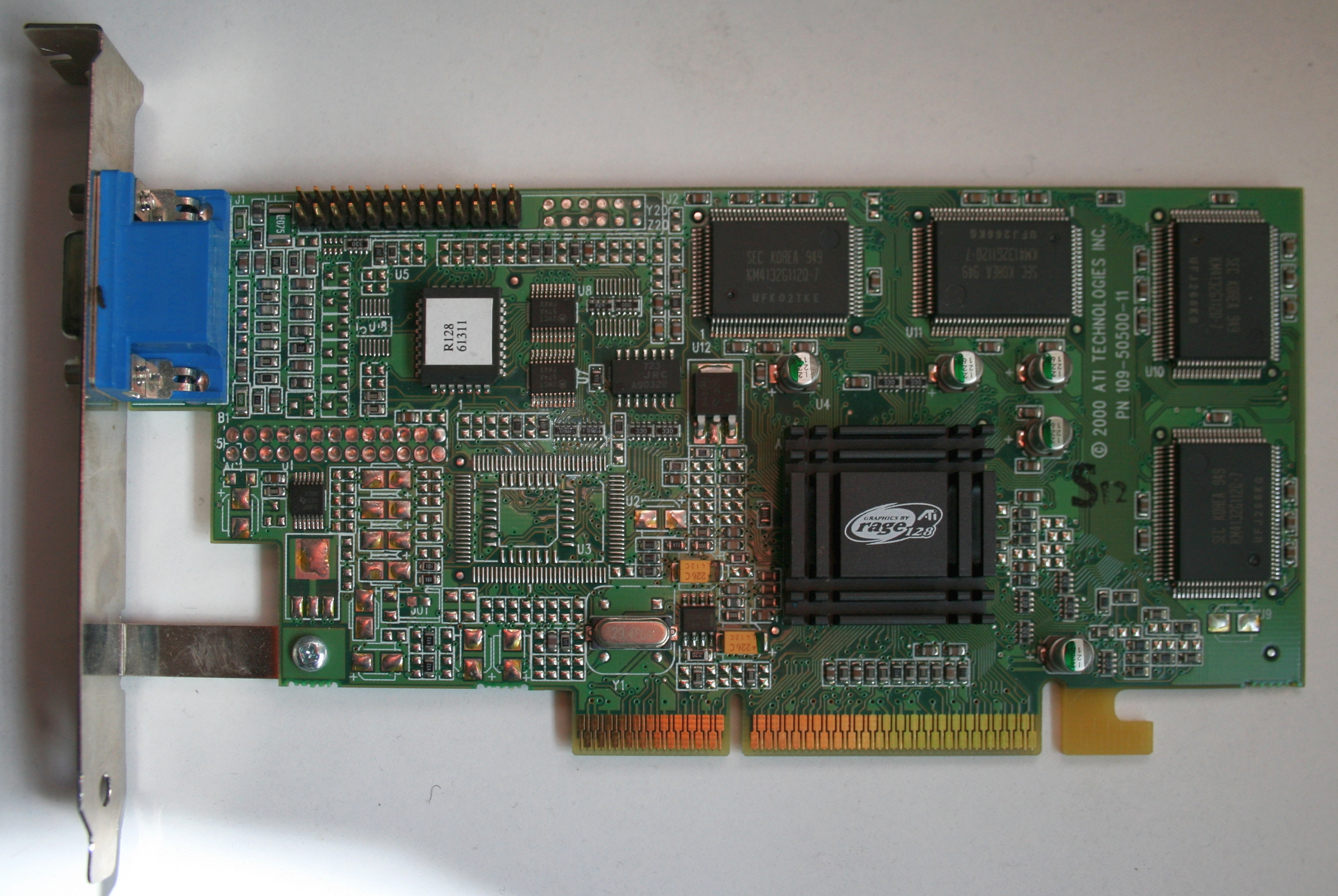
ATI Rage 128GL, 32 MB SGRAM

In the continuing struggle to create the fastest and most advanced 3D accelerator, ATI conceived the RAGE 128. The chip was announced in two flavors, the RAGE 128 GL and the RAGE 128 VR. Aside from the VR chip's lower price, the main difference was that the former was a full 128-bit design, while the VR, still a 128-bit processor internally, used a 64-bit external memory interface.

- Magnum - A workstation board for OEMs with 32 MB SDRAM.
- Rage Fury - 32 MB SDRAM memory and same performance as the Magnum, this add-in card was marketed for PC games.
- Xpert 128 - 16 MB SDRAM memory and, like the others, used the RAGE 128 GL chip.
- Rage Orion - RAGE 128 GL design specifically intended for Mac OS with 16 MB SDRAM memory, OpenGL and QuickDraw 3D/RAVE support, essentially a market-specific Xpert 128. This card supported more and different video resolutions than later Mac-specific RAGE 128 designs. This card was marketed for Macintosh games.
- Nexus 128 - Also a Mac-specific RAGE 128 GL design, but with 32 MB of RAM, similar to the Rage Fury. This card was targeted at graphics professionals.
- Xclaim VR 128 - Also a Mac-specific RAGE 128 GL design with 16 MB SDRAM memory, but included video capture, video out, TV tuner support and QuickTime video acceleration.
- Xpert 2000 - RAGE 128 VR design using 64-bit memory interface.

Rage 128 was compliant to Direct3D 6 and OpenGL 1.2. It supported many features from the previous RAGE chips, such as triangle setup, DVD acceleration, and a capable VGA/GUI accelerator core.

RAGE 128 added inverse discrete cosine transform (IDCT) acceleration to the DVD repertoire. It was ATI's first dual texturing renderer, in that it could output two pixels per clock (two pixel pipelines). The processor was known for its well-performing 32-bit color mode, but also its poorly dithered 16-bit mode; the RAGE 128 was not much faster in 16-bit color despite the lower bandwidth requirements.

In 32-bit mode, RAGE 128 was more than a match for the RIVA TNT, and the Voodoo 3 did not support 32-bit at all. The chip was meant to compete with the NVIDIA RIVA TNT, Matrox G200 and 3dfx Voodoo 2 in 1998.

ATI implemented a caching technique it called Twin Cache Architecture (TCA) with Rage 128. The Rage 128 used an 8 kB buffer to store texels that were used by the 3D engine. In order to improve performance even more, ATI engineers also incorporated an 8 KB pixel cache used to write pixels back to the frame buffer.

- 8 million transistors, 0.25 micrometer fabrication
- 3D Feature Set
  - Hardware support for vertex arrays, fog and fog table support
  - Alpha blending, vertex and Z-based fog, video textures, texture lighting
  - Single clock bilinear and trilinear texture filtering and texture compositing
  - Perspective-correct mip-mapped texturing with chroma-key support
  - Vertex and Z-based reflections, shadows, spotlights, 1.00 biasing
  - Hidden surface removal using 16, 24, or 32-bit Z-buffering
  - Gouraud and specular shaded polygons
  - Line and edge anti-aliasing, bump mapping, 8-bit stencil buffer
- 250 MHz RAMDAC, AGP 2×

== RAGE 128 Pro ==
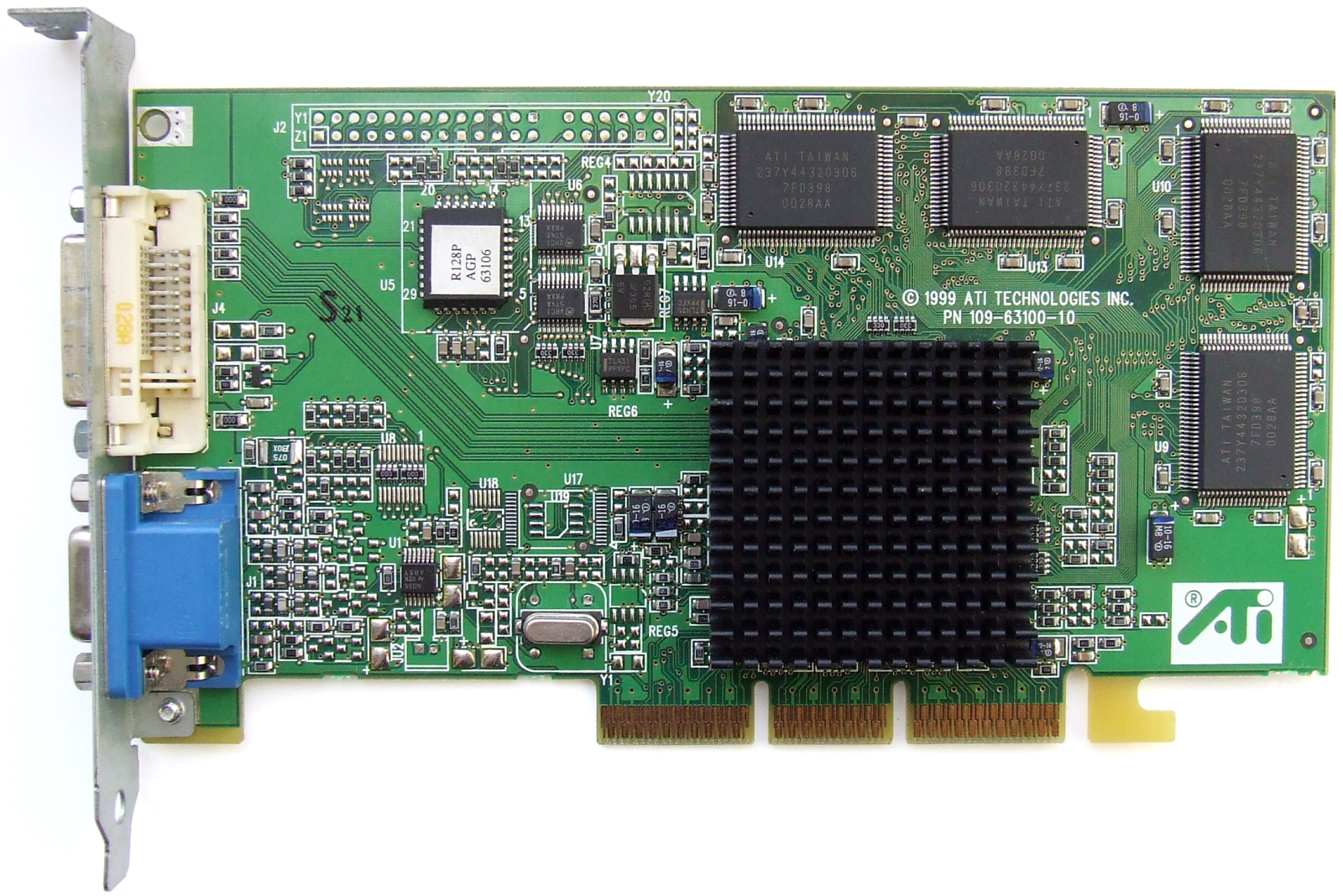
ATI Rage 128 Pro DVI, 32 MB SGRAM

Later, ATI developed a successor to the original Rage 128, called the Rage 128 Pro, used on the Rage Fury Pro & Rage Fury MAXX cards. This chip carried several enhancements, including an enhanced triangle setup engine that doubled geometry throughput to eight million triangles/s, better texture filtering, Direct3D 6.0 texture compression, AGP 4×, DVI support, and a Rage Theater chip for composite and S-Video TV-in. This chip was used on the game-oriented Rage Fury Pro boards and the business oriented Xpert 2000 PRO. The Rage 128 Pro was generally an even match for the Voodoo 3 2000, RIVA TNT2 and Matrox G400, but was often hindered by its lower clock (often at 125 MHz) when competing against the high end Voodoo3 3500, TNT2 ultra and G400 MAX.

=== Alternate frame rendering on the RAGE Fury MAXX ===
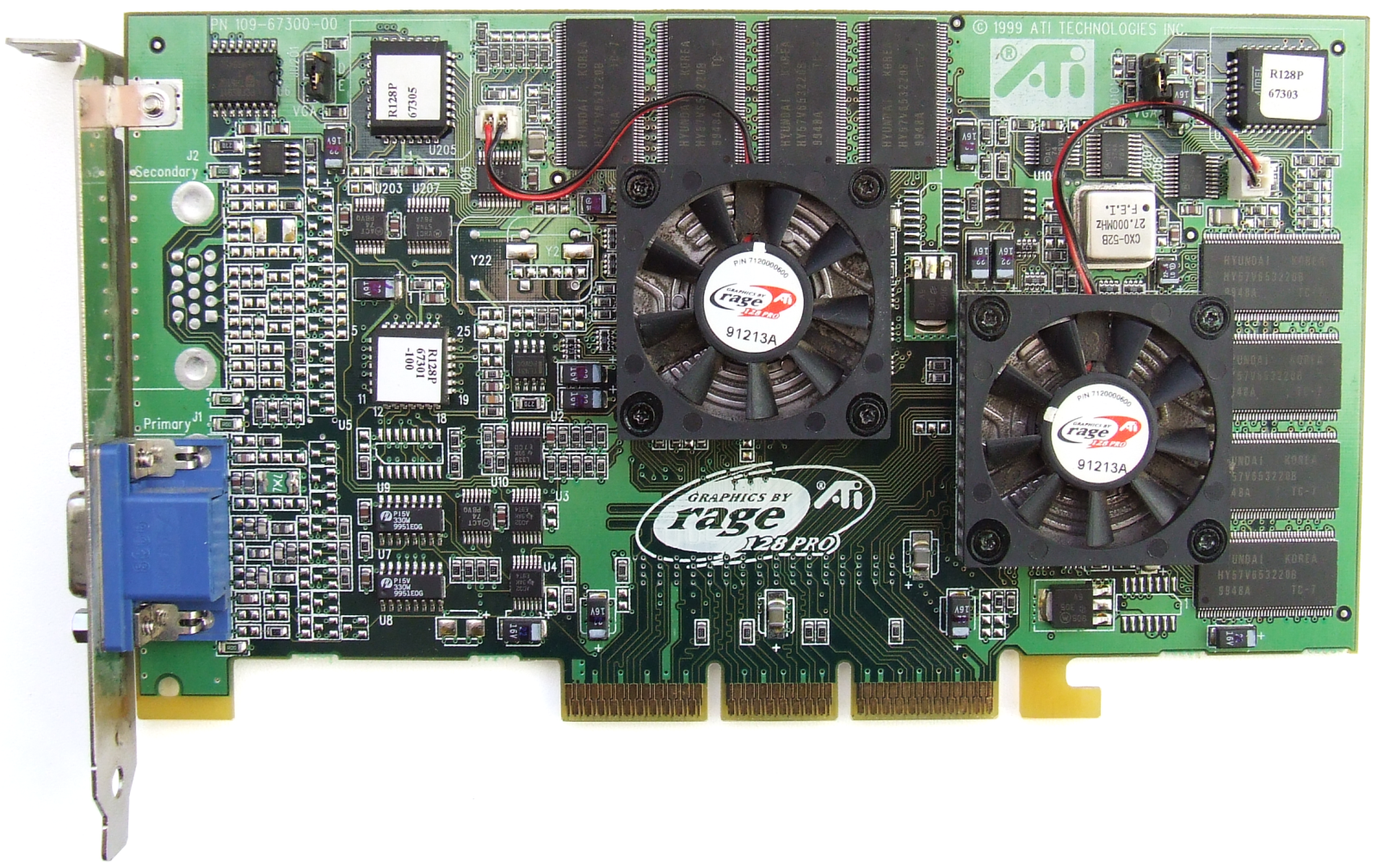
ATI Rage Fury MAXX, 2× 32 MB SDRAM

The Rage Fury MAXX board held dual Rage 128 Pro chips in an alternate frame rendering (AFR) configuration to allow a near-double increase in performance. As the name says, AFR renders each frame on an independent graphics processor. This board was meant to compete with the NVIDIA GeForce 256 and later the 3dfx Voodoo 5. While it was able to somewhat match 32 MB SDR GeForce 256 boards, the GeForce 256 cards with DDR memory still easily came out on top. Though there were few games that supported hardware transform, clipping, and lighting (T&L) at the time, the MAXX's lack of hardware T&L would put it at a disadvantage when such titles became more widespread.

It was later discovered by ATI that Windows NT 5.x operating systems (Windows 2000, XP) did not support dual AGP GPUs in the way ATI had implemented them. NT put them both on the AGP bus and switched between them, and so the board could only operate as a single Rage 128 Pro with the performance of a Rage Fury card. The optimal OS for the Rage Fury MAXX is Windows 98/ME. Windows 95 and Mac OS were not supported.

== Rage 6 (now called "Radeon") ==
The Rage 128 Pro graphics accelerator was the final revision of the Rage architecture and the last use of the Rage brand name. While the next iteration was initially code-named as Rage 6, ATI decided to rename it Radeon for release. The name is still in use today by AMD after acquiring ATI in 2006 (and indeed after the ATI brand was phased out in 2010).

== Rage Mobility (laptops) ==
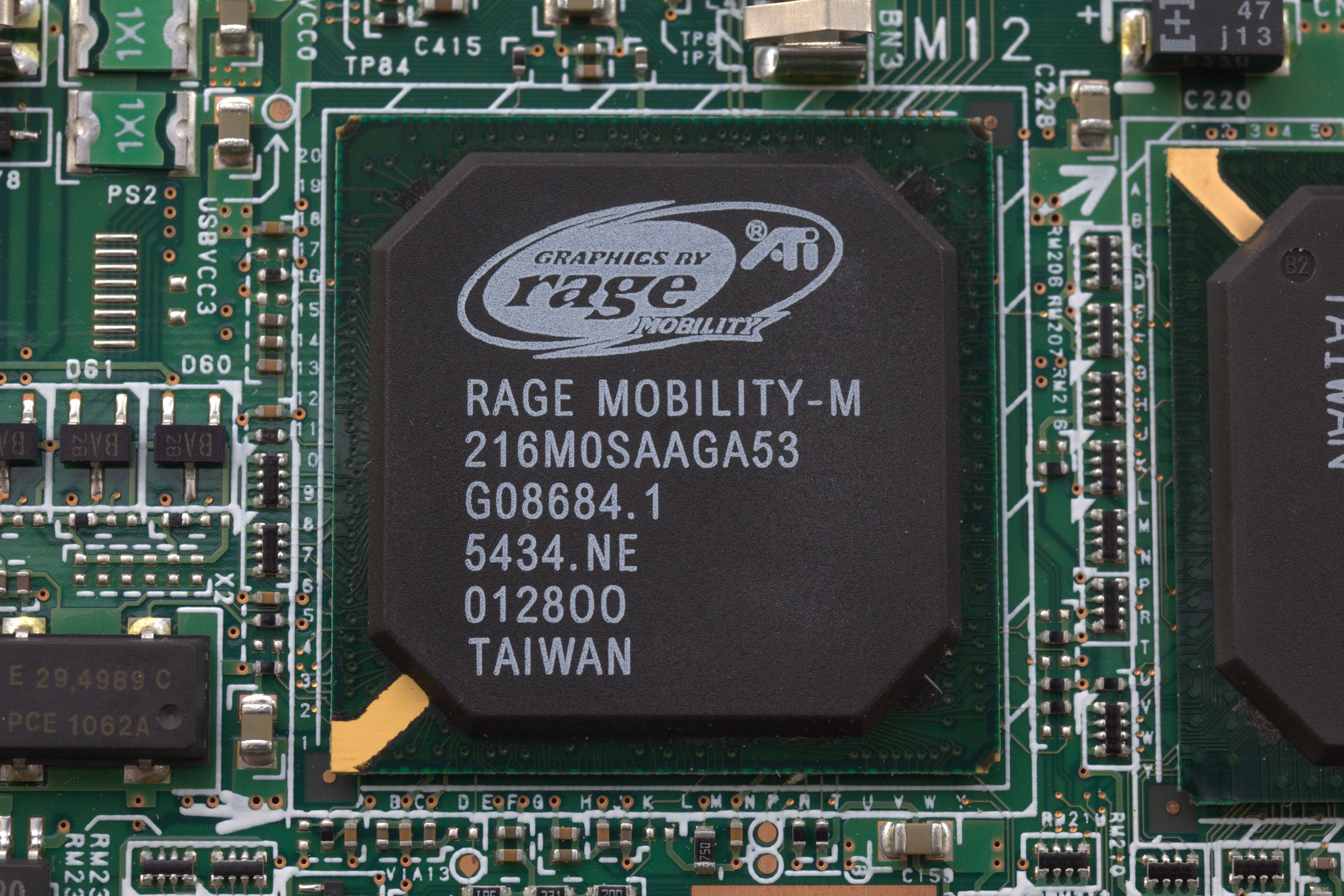
An ATI Rage Mobility-M from a Fujitsu Lifebook P series laptop

Rage Mobility succeeded the Rage LT and Rage LT Pro. Almost every version of Rage was used in mobile applications, but there were also some special versions of these chips which were optimized for this. They were ATI's first graphics solutions to carry the Mobility naming. Such chips included:

- RAGE Mobility C / EC / L / M2, (RAGE Pro-based) (Motion Compensation)
- RAGE Mobility P / M / M1 (RAGE Pro-based) (Motion Compensation, IDCT)
- RAGE Mobility 128 / M3 / M4 (RAGE 128 Pro-based) (Motion Compensation, IDCT)

== Models ==
Original Reference Card # (RAGE 128 Pro) : 109-60600-10

=== Desktop Models ===
- Entry Level
  - 3D RAGE
  - 3D RAGE II / II+DVD / IIc
  - 3D RAGE XL
  - 3D RAGE Pro / Xpert@Play / Xpert@Home
- Middle Range
  - RAGE Magnum (OEM Workstation Graphics)
  - RAGE 128 VR / Xpert 2000 Pro
  - RAGE 128 GL / Xpert 128
- High-End
  - RAGE 128 Pro
  - RAGE 128 Ultra (OEM Version of 128 Pro)
- Enthusiast
  - RAGE Fury Pro (Single Rage 128 Pro)
  - RAGE Fury MAXX (Dual Rage 128 Pro with Theater Chip)

=== Apple Specific Cards (based on RAGE 128 GL chip) ===
- Xclaim VR 128
- Nexus 128
- Rage Orion

=== List ===
Model	Launch	GPU arch	Fab (nm)	Bus interface	Core clock (MHz)	Memory clock (MHz)	Core config^{1}	Fillrate				Memory				Performance (FLOPS)	TDP (Watts)	API compliance	
Model	Launch	GPU arch	Fab (nm)	Bus interface	Core clock (MHz)	Memory clock (MHz)	Core config^{1}	MOperations/s	MPixels/s	MTexels/s	MVertices/s	Size (MiB)	Bandwidth (GB/s)	Bus type	Bus width (bit)	Performance (FLOPS)	TDP (Watts)	Direct3D	OpenGL
3D Rage	April 1996	Mach64	500	PCI	40	40	1:0:1:1	40	40	40	0	2	0.32	EDO	64	?	?	5.0	None^{2}
3D Rage II	September 1996	Mach64 (Rage2 for Rage IIc)	500	AGP 1× (Rage IIc only), PCI	60	83 (66 MHz with EDO)	1:0:1:1	60	60	60	0	2, 4, 8	0.664	EDO, SGRAM, SDR	64	?	?	5.0	None^{2}
Rage Pro	March 1997	Rage 3	350	AGP 1x, AGP 2×, PCI	75	75	1:0:1:1	75	75	75	0	4, 8, 16	0.6	EDO, SGRAM, SDR	64	?	6	6.0	1.1
Rage XL	August 1998	Rage 3	250	AGP 2×, PCI	83	125	1:0:1:1	83	83	83	0	8	1.0	SDR	64	?	9	6.0	1.1
Rage 128 VR	August 1998	Rage 4	250	AGP 2×, PCI	80	120	2:0:2:2	160	160	160	0	8, 32	0.96	SDR	64	?	?	6.0	1.2
Rage 128 GL	August 1998	Rage 4	250	AGP 2×, PCI	103	103	2:0:2:2	206	206	206	0	16, 32	1.648	SGRAM, SDR	128	?	?	6.0	1.2
Rage 128 Pro	August 1999	Rage 4	250	AGP 4×, PCI	125	143	2:0:2:2	250	250	250	0	16, 32	2.288	SGRAM, SDR	128	?	5	6.0	1.2
Rage 128 Ultra	August 1999	Rage 4	250	AGP 4×, PCI	130	130	2:0:2:2	260	260	260	0	16, 32, 64	2.088	SDR	128	?	?	6.0	1.2
Rage Fury MAXX	October 1999	Rage 4	250	AGP 4×	125	143	2:0:2:2 ×2	500	500	500	0	32 ×2	4.576	SDR	128 ×2	?	?	6.0	1.2

^{1} Pixel pipelines : Vertex shaders : Texture mapping units : Render output units
^{2} OpenGL 1.0 (Generic 2D) is provided through software implementations.

==== Rage Mobility series ====
These GPUs are integrated into the mainboard.

Model	Launch	Fab (nm)	Bus interface	Core clock (MHz)	Memory clock (MHz)	Hardware T&L	Core config^{1}	Fillrate		Memory				API compliance (version)		Notes
Model	Launch	Fab (nm)	Bus interface	Core clock (MHz)	Memory clock (MHz)	Hardware T&L	Core config^{1}	Pixel (MP/s)	Texture (MT/s)	Size (MB)	Bandwidth (GB/s)	Bus type	Bus width (bit)	Direct3D	OpenGL	Notes
Rage LT (Rage II)	Nov 1996	500	PCI	60	66	No	0:1:1:1	60	60	4	0.53	EDO, SDR, SGR	64	5	N/A	
Rage LT Pro (Rage Pro)	Nov 1997	350	AGP, PCI	75	100	No	0:1:1:1	75	75	8	0.80	EDO, SDR, SGR	64	6	1.1	Motion compensation
Rage Mobility M/P (Rage Pro)	Nov 1998	250	AGP, PCI	90	Unknown	No	0:1:1:1	180	180	8	Unknown	SDR, SGR	64	Unknown	Unknown	M had 4 MB of integrated SDRAM, P had none. IDCT, motion compensation.
Rage Mobility M1 (Rage Pro)	Feb 1999	250	AGP, PCI	90	90	No	0:1:1:1	180	180	8	0.72	SDR	64	6	1.2	M1 had 8 MB of integrated SDRAM, P had none. IDCT, motion compensation.
Rage 128 GL	Aug 1998	250	AGP, PCI	103	103	No	0:2:2:2	206	206	32	1.65	SDR	128	6	1.2	
Rage Mobility 128 (Rage 128 Pro)	Oct 1999	250	AGP, PCI	105	105	No	0:2:2:2	210	210	16	2.28	SDR	128	6	1.2	IDCT, Motion Compensation
Rage Mobility M3 (AGP 4×) (Rage 128 Pro)	Oct 1999	250	AGP, PCI	105	105	No	0:2:2:2	210	210	16	2.28	SDR	128	6	1.2	M3 had 8 MB of integrated SDRAM, IDCT, Motion Compensation.
Rage Mobility M4 (AGP 4×) (Rage 128 Pro)	Oct 1999	250	AGP, PCI	105	105	No	0:2:2:2	210	210	32	2.28	SDR	128	6	1.2	M4 had 16 MB of integrated SDRAM, IDCT, Motion Compensation.

^{1} Vertex shaders : Pixel shaders : Texture mapping units : Render output units.

== Die shots ==
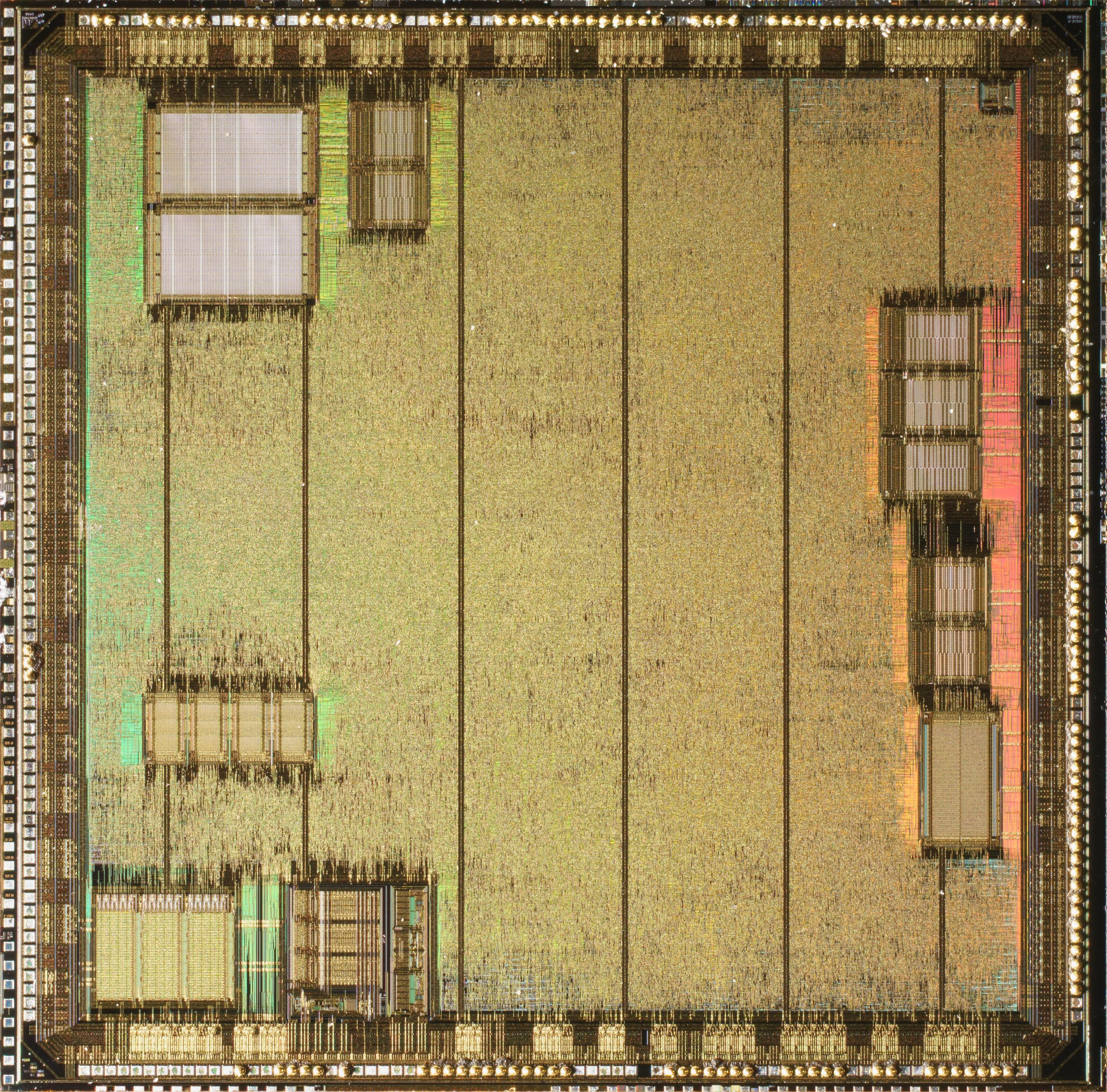
3D RAGE II

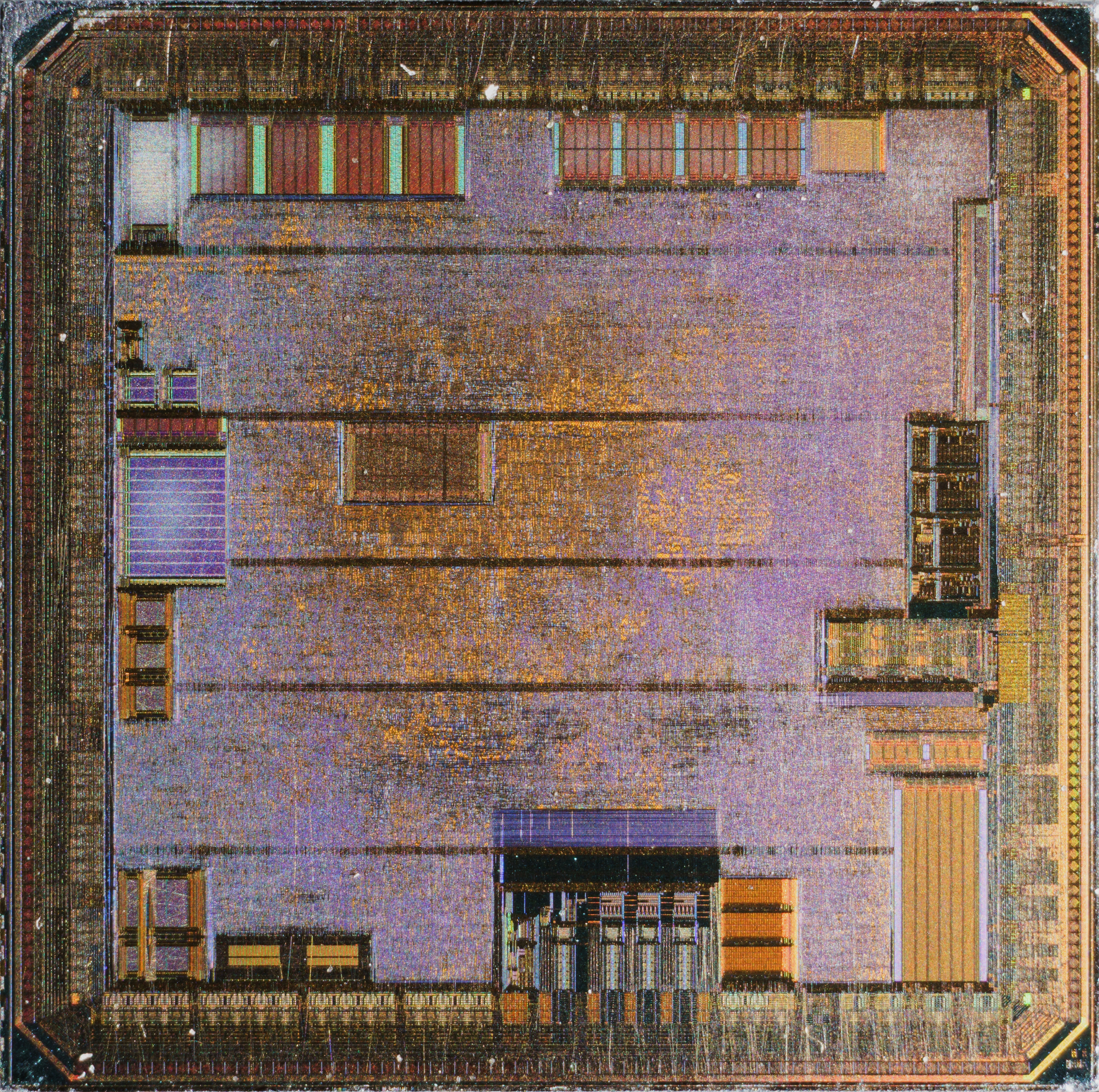
Rage XL

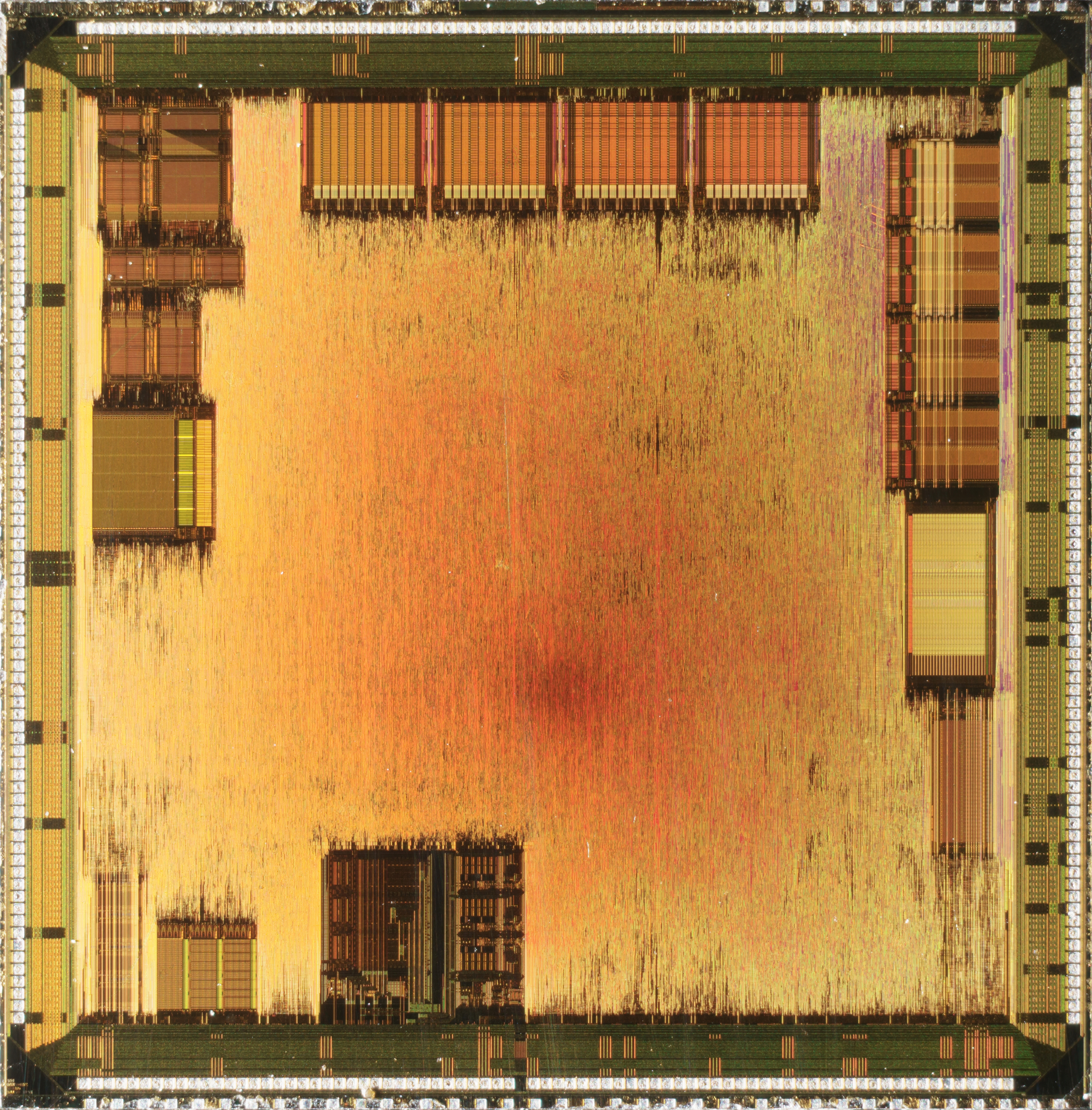
Rage PRO

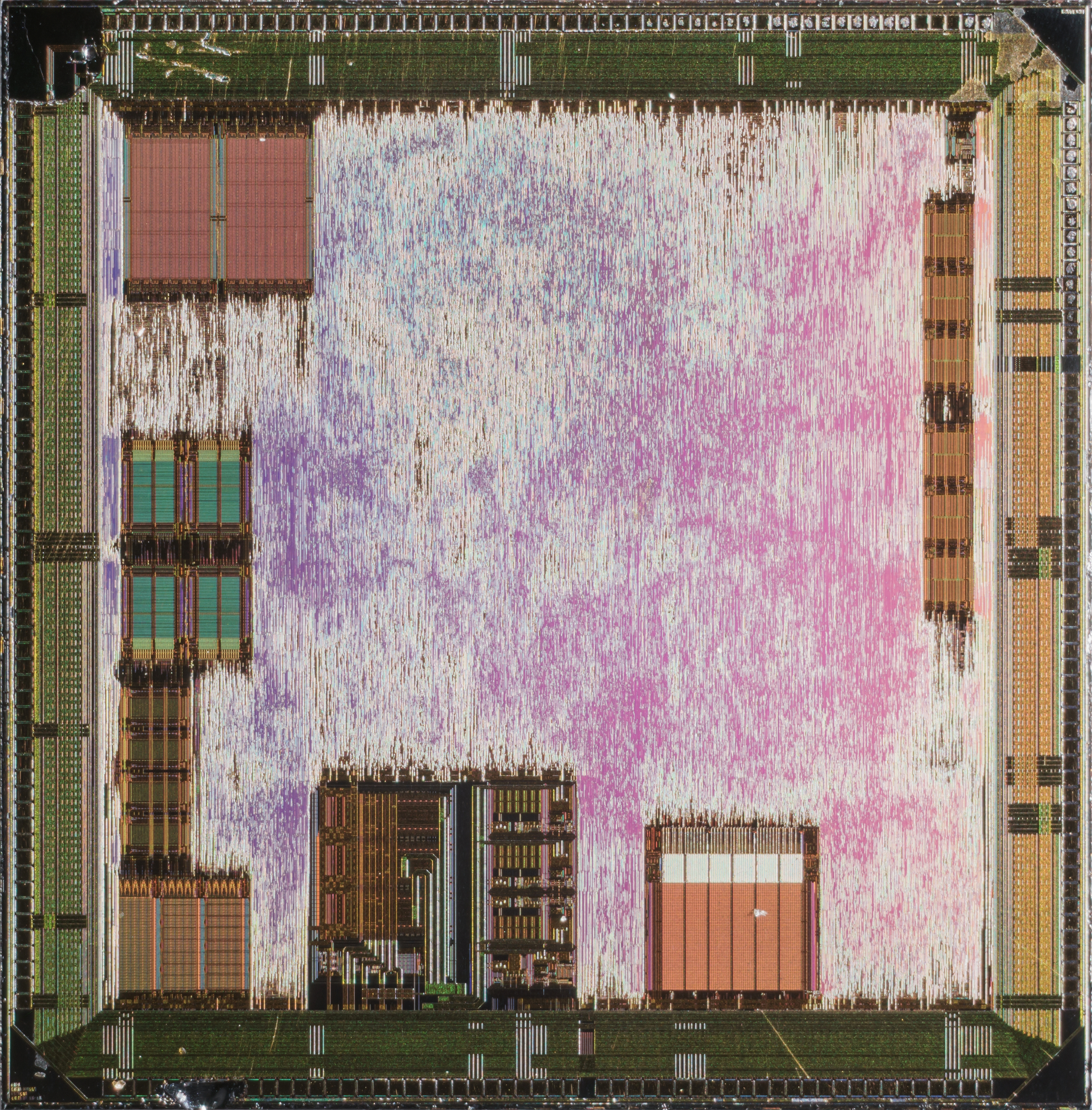
Rage IIC

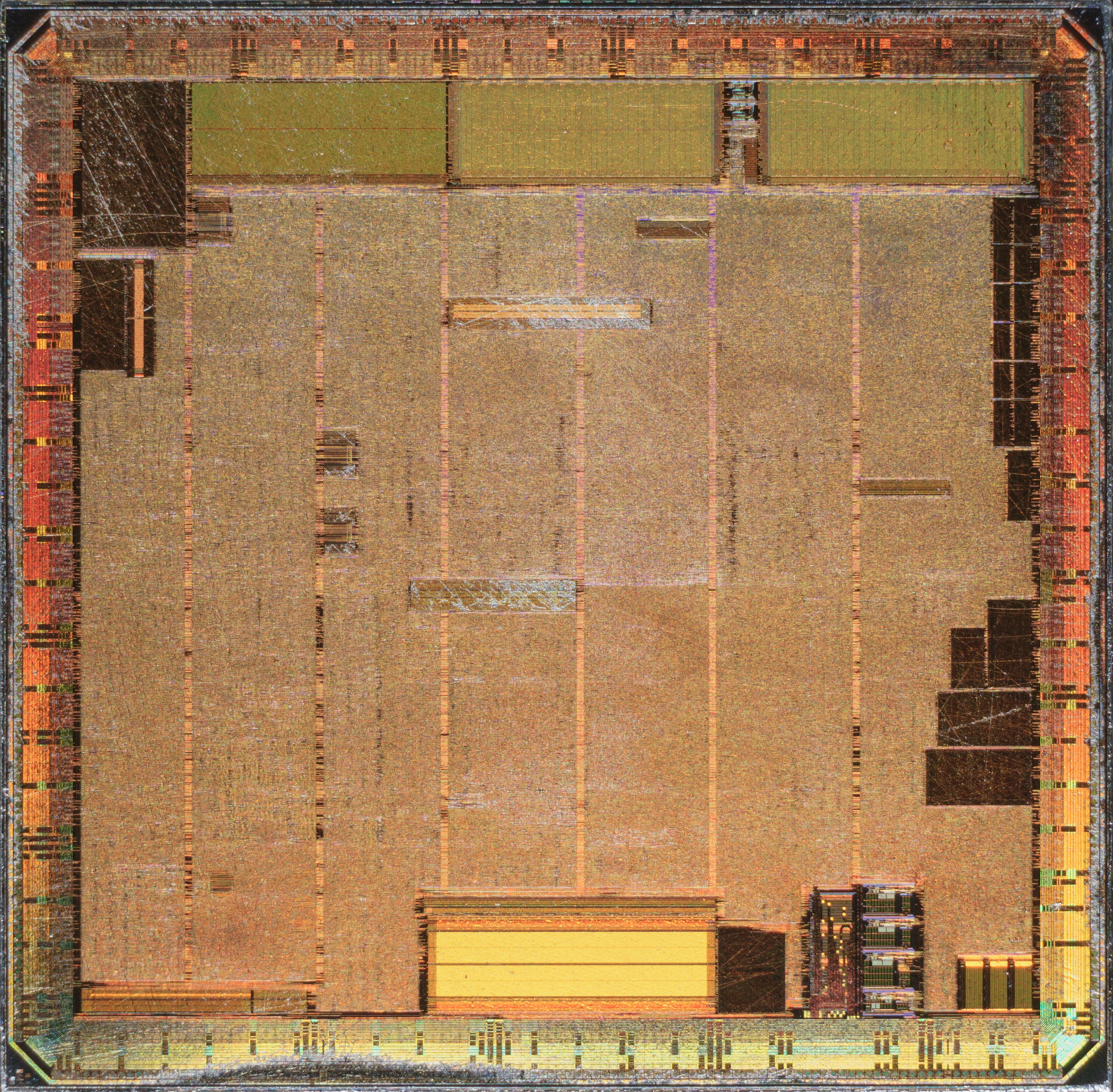
Rage 128 GL

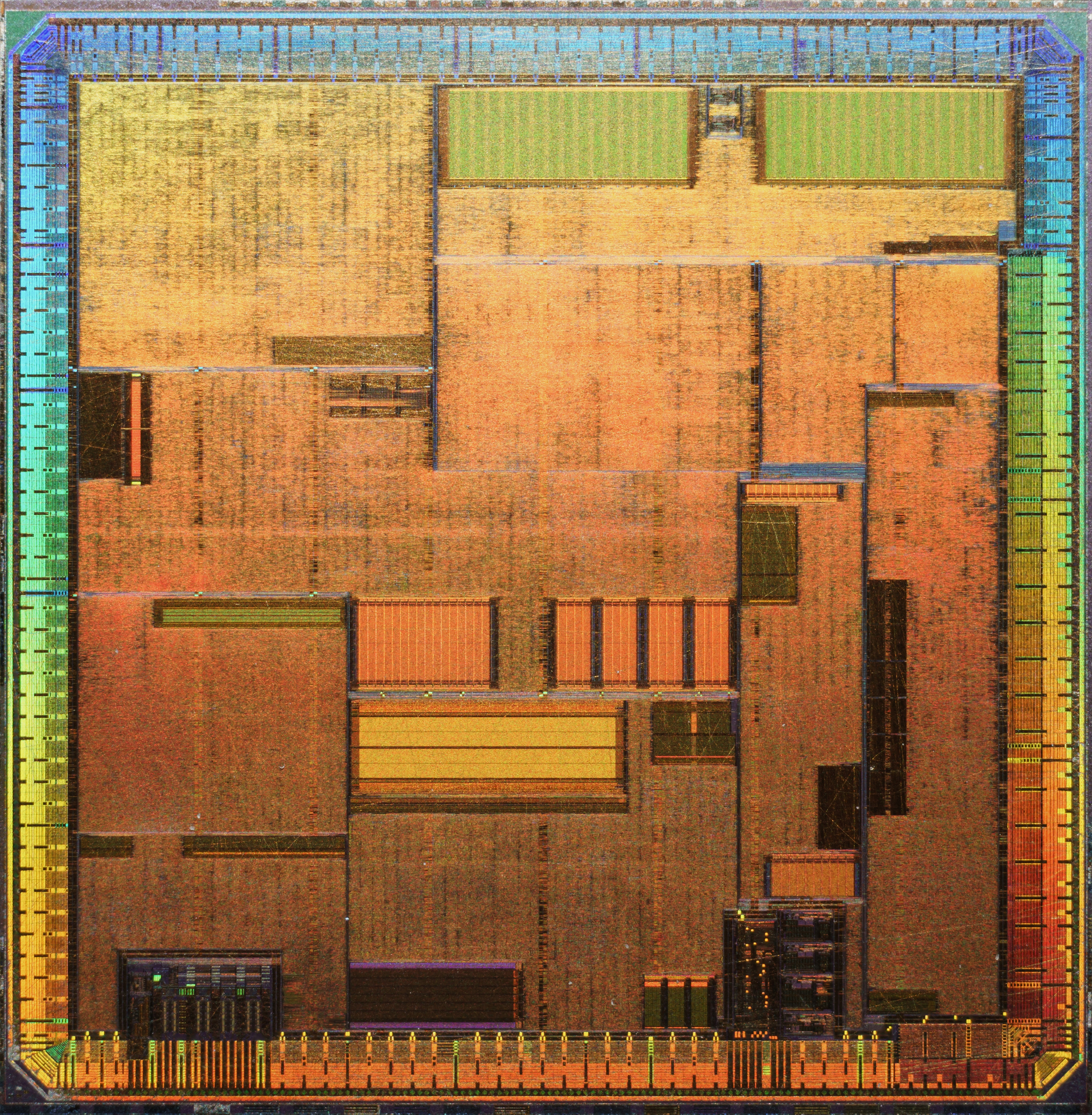
Rage 128 Pro

== See also ==
- AMD CrossFire – Scalable Link Interface (SLI) equivalent of NVIDIA
- List of AMD graphics processing units
