= CMD640 =

IDE controller

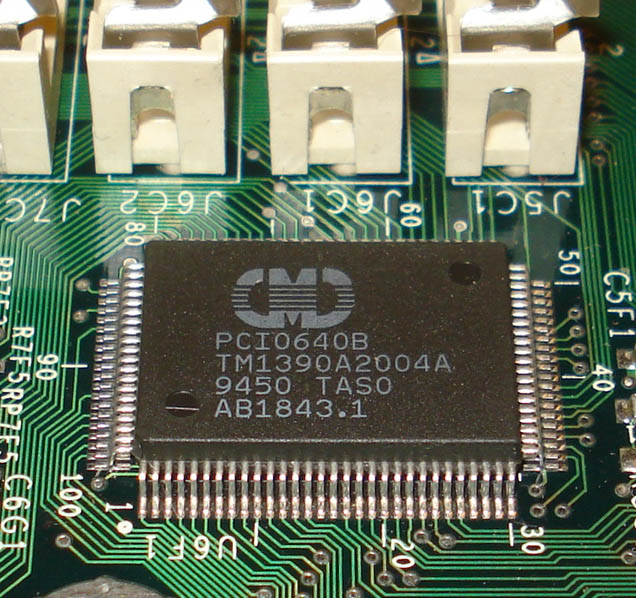
CMD 640b PCI IDE controller

CMD640, the California Micro Devices Technology Inc product 0640, is an IDE interface chip for the PCI and VLB buses. CMD640 has some sort of hardware acceleration: WDMA and Read-Ahead (prefetch) support.

CMD Technology Inc was acquired by Silicon Image Inc. in 2001.

| Chip | Protocol |
|---|---|
| SiI/CMD 640 | MDMA 1 |
| SiI/CMD 643 | MDMA 2 |
| SiI/CMD 646 | UDMA 2 |
| SiI/CMD 648 | UDMA 4 |
| SiI/CMD 649 | UDMA 5 |
| SiI0680 | UDMA 6 |

== Hardware bug ==
The original CMD640 has data corruption bugs, some of which remained in CMD646. The data corruption bug is similar to the bug affecting the contemporaneous PC Tech (a subsidiary of Zeos) RZ1000 chipset. Both chipsets were used on a number of motherboards, including those from Intel.

Modern operating systems have a workaround for this bug by prohibiting aggressive acceleration mode and losing about 10% of the performance.
