= Digital Display Working Group =

Industry consortium that developed the DVI standard

The Digital Display Working Group (DDWG) was a technological consortium whose purpose was to define and maintain the Digital Visual Interface standard, which was formed in 1998. It was organized by Intel, Silicon Image, Compaq, Fujitsu, HP, IBM, and NEC. The best-known published specification is the DVI standard.

== History ==
The group developed the Digital Visual Interface (DVI) standard in 1999.

In 2011, founding member HP reported that the group had not met in 5 years.
