= Silicon Image =

Semiconductor manufacturing company

Silicon Image Inc.
- Trade name: Silicon Image
- Type: Subsidiary (formerly public)
- Traded as: Nasdaq: SIMG
- Industry: Semiconductors
- Founded: 1995; 31 years ago in Sunnyvale, California
- Defunct: 2015; 11 years ago
- Fate: Acquired by Lattice Semiconductor
- Headquarters: Hillsboro, Oregon, USA
- Key people: Darin Billerbeck (CEO)
- Products: Semiconductor and intellectual property products for mobile, consumer electronics, and PC markets

Silicon Image Inc. was an American fabless semiconductor company based in Hillsboro, Oregon, and active from 1995 to 2015. The company designed circuits for mobile phones, consumer electronics and personal computers (PCs). It also manufactured wireless and wired connectivity products used for high-definition content. The company's semiconductor and IP products were deployed by manufacturers in devices such as smartphones, tablets, digital televisions (DTVs), and other consumer electronics, as well as desktop and notebook PCs. Silicon Image, in cooperation with other companies, was influential in the creation of some global industry standards such as DVI, HDMI, MHL, and WirelessHD.

Silicon Image was founded in 1995, and was headquartered in Sunnyvale, California, before moving to Hillsboro. The company reached peak employment of around 600 people worldwide and had regional engineering and sales offices in India, China, Japan, Korea and Taiwan, before being acquired by Lattice Semiconductor in 2015.

== History ==
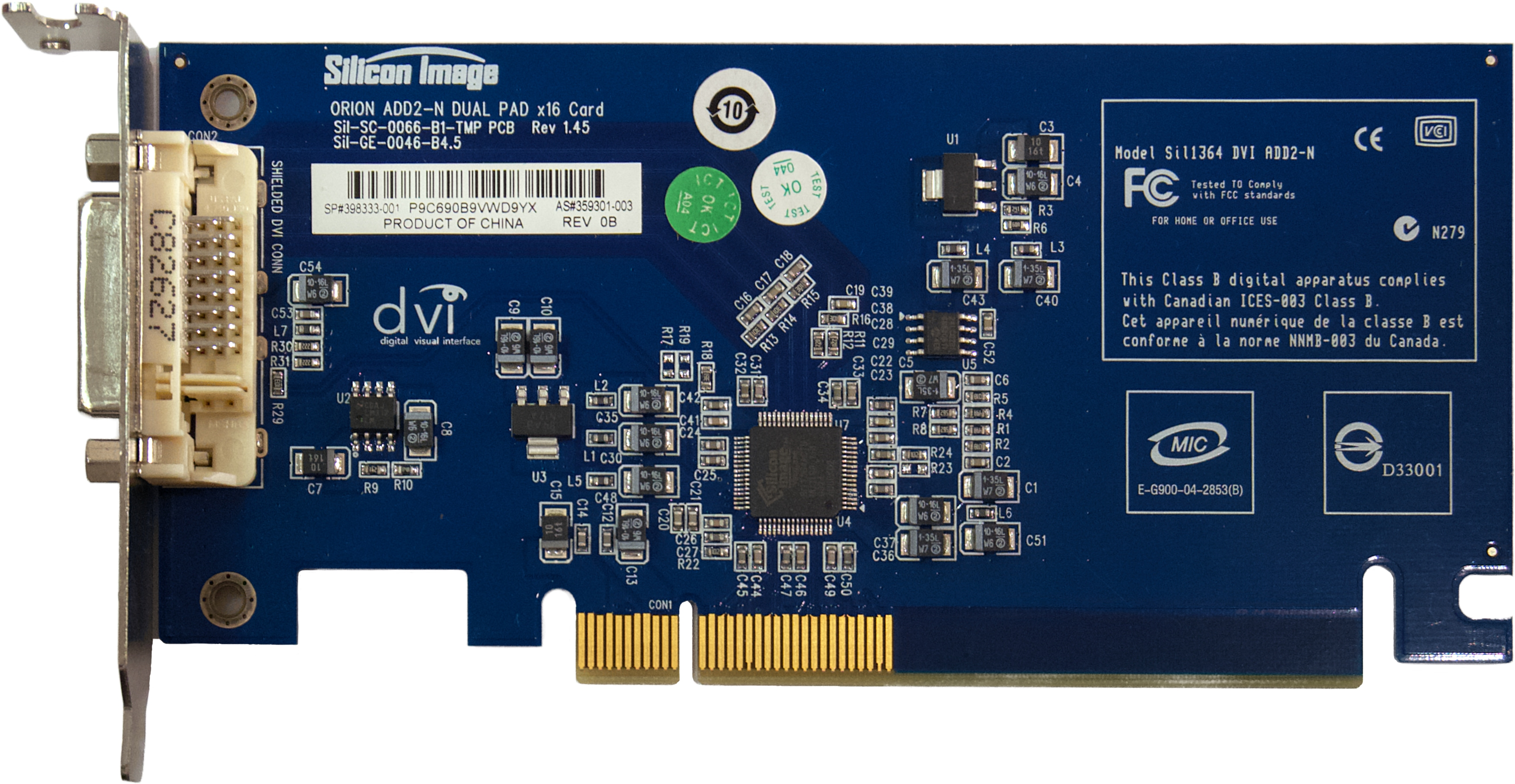
This Silicon Image card adds a DVI output to PCs that have built-in Intel graphics hardware supporting SDVO

The company was founded in 1995 by Silicon Valley engineers David Lee and Brian Underwood. In October 1999 it raised $46.8 million in an initial public offering.

- March 2000: Silicon Image Inc. agreed to buy the closely held DVDO Inc. for $45 million in stock to add technology for digital televisions, DVD players and high-definition video
- June 2001: acquired CMD Technology Inc., a provider of SCSI and Fibre Channel storage controllers for the UNIX, Open Systems and PC markets as well as a supplier of IDE/Ultra ATA semiconductors (including CMD064x chips) for the PC and embedded markets
- January 2007: Silicon Image completes acquisition of Sci-worx GmbH
- June 2007: Silicon Image shipped its 1 millionth DTV input processor
- January 2009: Silicon Image wins Emmy Award for HDMI technology
- December 2010: Silicon Image introduces ViaPort technology
- February 2011: Silicon Image completes acquisition of Anchor Bay Technologies
- May 2011: Silicon Image completes acquisition of SiBEAM, Inc.
- May 2011: Silicon Image unveils third-generation WirelessHD 60 GHz chipsets
- August 2013: MHL Consortium announces new specification with major advancements for mobile and consumer electronics connectivity
- September 2013: Silicon Image announces first 4K UltraHD MHL 3.0 receiver IC with HDCP 2.2 in support of secure premium content
- March 2015: Silicon Image is acquired by Lattice Semiconductor for $600 million.
