= List of video connectors =

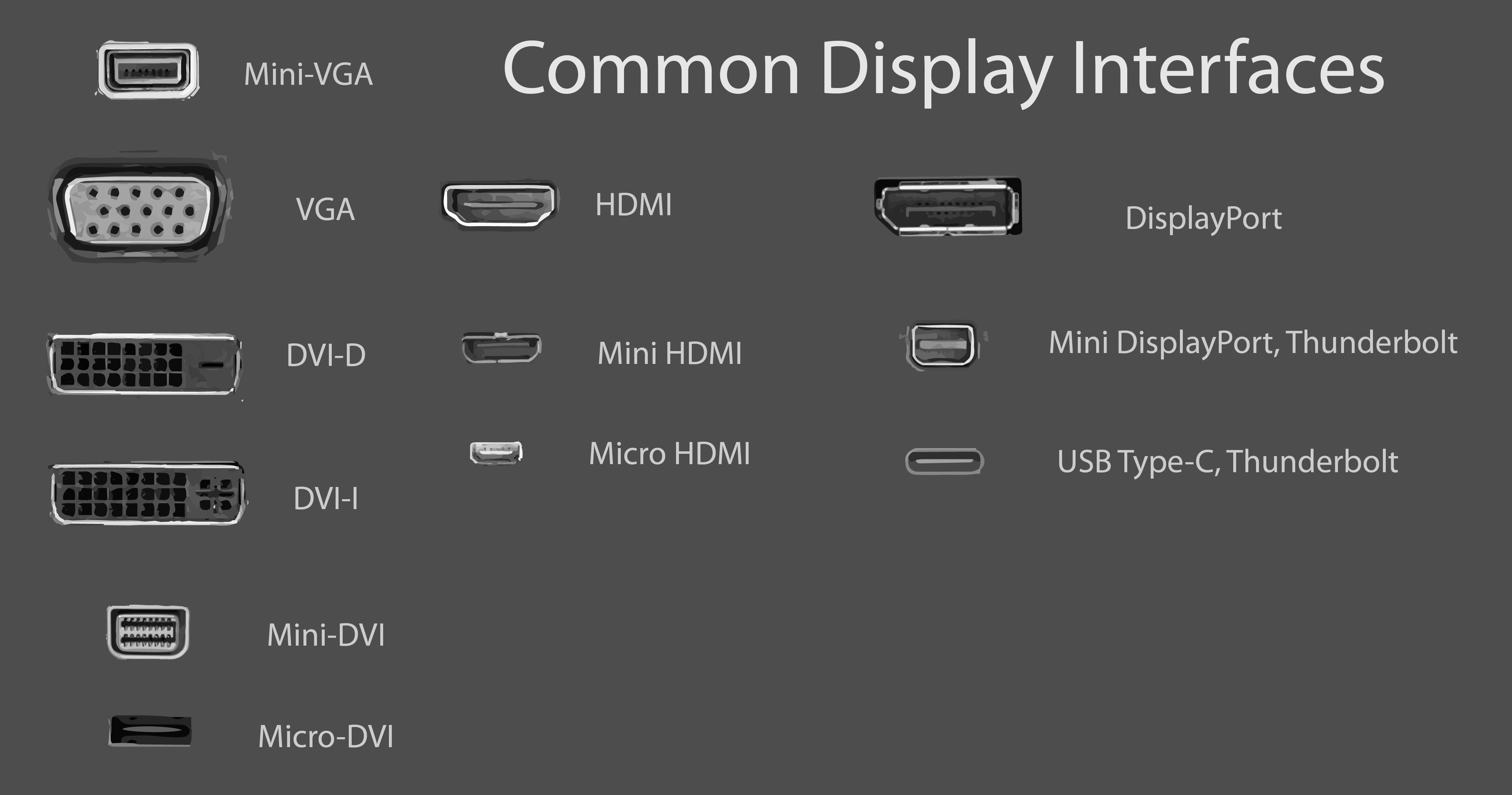
Common display interfaces, to scale

This is a list of physical RF and video connectors and related video signal standards.

== Physical connectors ==
Image	Class or connector name	Used for	Notes
RF connectors (radio frequency signals). Generally use coaxial cable types such as RG-6 and RG-59 (except for twin-lead).
Belling-Lee/IEC 169-2 connector	TV aerial plug (a.k.a. antenna plug)	Television antenna connection for most video devices outside North America. Used by early home computers and game consoles to connect them to TVs because of the lack of any other connector.	Generally not used in North America.
	BNC	Alternative to RCA for professional video electronics. Protocols: Serial digital interface (SDI) and HD-SDI.; CoaXPress	75 Ω for video signal (SDI and CoaXPress) on, for example, RG59 and RG6. 50 Ω for data link, like Ethernet on RG58. 93 Ω on RG62.
50 Ω (white/bottom row) and 75 Ω C connectors (red/top row)	C connector (Concelman connector)		
General Radio 874 connectors	GR connector (General Radio connector)	Mostly seen on the company's test equipment.	Uniquely "hermaphrodite" connector, i.e. no male/female pairing. cf. Anderson connector
	F connector	Used for most North American TV antenna connections, as well as satellite and cable systems worldwide. Also common in North America for early home computers and game consoles, older VCRs, RF modulators, and even CECBs due to lack of other connectors.	Once not used outside North America for TV antennas (except for satellite reception), but gaining acceptance elsewhere with advent of digital TV.
	N connector (Neill connector)	Mostly seen on professional quality VHF and UHF cables and equipment.	Generally 50 Ω but has been manufactured as 75 Ω; difference being thinner centre connectors; not reliably interconnected.
TNC connector (left), compared with BNC (right)	Threaded Neill-Concelman connector (TNC)		
	Twin-lead	Used for older TV antenna installations in the US and various other countries worldwide. Current use generally limited to baluns to adapt 300 Ω twin-lead to/from 75 Ω F connector.	Replaced by F connector in North America and Belling-Lee Connector in other countries outside North America.
	UHF connector (e.g. PL-259/SO-239)	Despite its name, now most commonly seen on higher-power HF radio equipment, e.g. SSB transceivers. A popular choice for amateur radio enthusiasts.	50 Ω

=== D-subminiature family ===
Image	Class or connector name	Used for	Notes
	CGA, MDA, EGA, PGC connector (DE-9)	The historical connector used by MDA, CGA, EGA graphic cards is a female nine-pin D-subminiature (DE-9). The signal standard and pinout are backward-compatible with CGA, allowing EGA monitors to be used on CGA cards and vice versa. The IBM PGC from 1985 also used this connector but with a different pinout.	Early VGA and PGC-derived cards used this connector based on the PGC pinout.
	VGA connector (DE-15)	Became a nearly ubiquitous analog computer display connector after first being introduced with IBM x86 machines. Older VGA connectors were DE-9 (9-pin). The modern DE-15 connector can carry Display Data Channel to allow the monitor to communicate with the graphics card, and optionally vice versa.	Being replaced by DVI from 1999 onward.
	DB13W3	Analog computer video, colour and monochrome. Sun Microsystems, Silicon Graphics, IBM RISC, Intergraph and some Apple Computer computer workstations.	Obsolete; replaced by VGA and DVI. Same connector was used by 3Com for a redundant PSU on the 3300 switch family.

=== DVI-related ===
Image	Class or connector name	Used for	Notes
Single-link DVI-D male plug. Dual-link DVI-D male plug.	Digital Visual Interface (DVI). Five variants are: DVI-I single link, DVI-I dual link, DVI-D single link, DVI-D dual link, and DVI-A.		
Male Mini-DVI plug on top of a 12-inch PowerBook G4; female port is second from left.	Mini-DVI	VGA, DVI, television. Apple Computer alternative to Mini-VGA.	Often now replaced by Mini DisplayPort.
Female Micro-DVI port (rightmost) on MacBook Air	Micro-DVI	DVI-D dual link	Replaced with Mini DisplayPort.
	DMS-59	twin DVI (for two monitors via an adapter cable)	
	Apple Display Connector	Combines DVI, USB, and power.	
HDMI connector plugs (male): Type D (Micro), Type C (Mini), and Type A.	High-Definition Multimedia Interface (HDMI)	High definition digital video devices (HDMI protocol)	Electrically compatible with DVI-D and DVI-I, but not DVI-A, using a simple adapter.

=== DIN/Mini-DIN ===
Image	Class or connector name	Used for	Notes
	DIN-style 10-pin	CCJ connector	
	Mini-DIN 4-pin	S-Video (separate video, split video, super-video, or Y/C)	
	Various Mini-DIN configurations	Various systems and protocols - see Mini-DIN for details	

=== Others ===
Image	Class or connector name	Used for	Notes
Three RCA connectors - yellow for composite video, and white and red for stereo audio	RCA connector	Widely used in consumer electronics for audio and video.	A single connector must be used for each signal.
	SCART	Consumer electronics, mostly in Europe. Carries analog stereo sound, along with composite video and/or RGB video. Some devices also support S-Video, which shares the same pins as composite video and RGB. YP_{B}P_{R} is also sometimes supported as a non-standard extension via the RGB pins.	
	D-Terminal	Popular in Japan for analog high definition video. Available resolutions are specified as D1 through D5.	
	PDMI	Advent Vega; Dell Streak; Boeing Black	30 pin receptacle including the following electrical interfaces: 2-lane DisplayPort v1.1a, USB 3.0, USB On-The-Go, Analog stereo line-out, HDMI CEC for remote control, high output power line from both host and portable device
Male Mini-VGA plug on top of an Apple laptop, female port is second from right.	Mini-VGA (used for laptops)	Used for laptops, especially from Apple Computer and some from Sony.	
AV Multi (gold-plated male plug)	AV Multi	Sony proprietary. Combines composite video, S-Video, RGsB/YP_{B}P_{R} (both use same pins) and stereophonic sound (two analog channels).	Used for all analog audio and video out on for the PlayStation, PlayStation 2 and PlayStation 3 video game consoles. (A few early original PlayStation models featured RCA outs for composite video and stereo analog audio in addition to the AV Multi connector.)
	35-pin MicroCross Molex connector	VESA Enhanced Video Connector and VESA Plug and Display (a.k.a. M1-DA) both used this connector with slightly different pin assignments. These schemes combined VGA or digital video, audio, FireWire, and USB signals into a single connector.	Deprecated. Made obsolete by DFP and later DVI.
	HDI-45	Apple proprietary. Combines Analog VGA out, stereo analog audio out, analog microphone in, S-video capture in, Apple desktop bus interface.	Proprietary connector used on Apple Macintosh Centris computers, and the Apple AudioVision 14 Display. An attempt by Apple to deal with cable clutter, by combining five separate cables from computer to monitor.
Female port (20-pin)	Digital Flat Panel (DFP)	Used with the PanelLink digital video protocol.	Deprecated. Made obsolete by DVI.
3D model of a UDI connector	Unified Display Interface		Proposed to replace both DVI and HDMI. Deprecated by Intel in favor of DisplayPort.
3.5 mm TRRS connector (male)	3.5 mm (1/8 in) TRRS and TRS connector	Analog camcorders commonly use a 3.5 mm four-contact TRRS connector to carry composite video and stereo audio.	Jack appears identical to more common three-contact stereo audio-only (Walkman) 3.5 mm TRS connector.
	DisplayPort	DisplayPort (DP) was designed to replace VGA, DVI, and FPD-Link and standardized by VESA. It is primarily used to connect a video source to a display device such as a computer monitor. It can also carry audio, USB, and other forms of data. DisplayPort is backward compatible with other interfaces such as HDMI and DVI through the use of active or passive adapters.	
Male Mini DisplayPort plug	Mini DisplayPort	Proposed alternative to HDMI, used with computer displays: (VGA, DVI) Apple Inc.'s successor to their own Mini-DVI.	The same connector is used for Intel's Thunderbolt 1 and 2, developed in cooperation with Apple.
	HDBaseT (8P8C modular connector)	Used for transmission of uncompressed high-definition video, audio, Ethernet, high-power over cable and various controls, via a 100 m Cat5e/Cat6 cable with 8P8C modular connectors of the type commonly used for telephone and Ethernet LAN connections.	
	USB-C	USB-C and Thunderbolt 3 and later can deliver DisplayPort over USB-C signalling.	

== By signal standard ==
Signal standard name	Introduction year	Connector	Type	Max. resolution (X-px × Y-px (i) @ Z-Hz)	Used for	Notes
Composite video	1956	1 RCA, BNC, TV Aerial Plug, Mini-VGA, DIN 5-pin, SCART 21-pin	Analog	567 lines or 625 lines tv compatible	Consumer electronics, including VCR and LaserDisc, 1970–1980s home computers like the VIC-20, 1980s–1990s video game consoles, some laptops, some single-board computers like the Raspberry Pi	Used with PAL, NTSC or SECAM color.
RGBS	1977	SCART 21-pin (aka Peritel), JP-21, DE-9, DE-15 (VGA), BNC, RCA	Analog	originally 567 lines or 625 lines tv compatible, up to any resolution limited by hardware	Consumer electronics, professional and industrial video. Early home computers such as Commodore Amiga, Acorn Archimedes and various gaming consoles such as the Mega Drive and Super NES. The IBM PGC in 1985 used RGBS at 640 × 480 over a DE-9 connector and it has been used over other physical connectors as well.	SCART is a European "unified" A/V interface for bi-directional stereo audio, composite video and s-video, and unidirectional RGBS and data. YP_{B}P_{R} is also available in some non-standard set-ups via the RGB pins.
S-Video (a.k.a. separate video, split video, super-video, and Y/C)	1979	1 Mini-DIN 4-pin, 1 Mini-DIN 7-pin, 1 Mini-VGA, 2 BNC, 2 RCA connectors, 8-pin DIN, SCART 21-pin	Analog	567 lines or 625 lines tv compatible	S-VHS, some laptop computers, analog broadcast video, 1980-1990s home computers including the Commodore 64, C128 and Atari 8-bit computers	The 4-pin mini-DIN that is most common in consumer products today debuted in JVC's 1987 S-VHS. The 7-pin mini-DIN is commonly used on laptops. Used with PAL, NTSC or SECAM color. Where two connectors are used, they are labeled Chroma and Luma.
MDA	1981	DE-9	Digital	720 × 350 @ 50, Text only	IBM PC, PC/XT, PC/AT and compatibles	
RGBI (CGA)	1981	DE-9	Digital	640 × 200 @ 60	IBM PC, PC/XT, PC/AT and compatibles	
RGBI (CGA)	1981	DE-9	Digital	640 × 200 @ 60	IBM PC, PC/XT, PC/AT and compatibles	
HGC	1982	DE-9	Digital	720 × 348 @ 50	IBM PC, PC/XT, PC/AT and compatibles	
EGA	1984	DE-9	Digital	640 × 350 @ 60	IBM PC, PC/XT, PC/AT and compatibles	
Amiga video	1985	DB23	Both, GenLock	1280 × 400/512 @ 30/25	Commodore Amiga	Similar to SCART, but also includes a digital RGBI signal, Genlock clock, composite sync and +12/+5VDC power
RGBHV	1987	VGA connector (DE-15/HD-15), DE-9, separate BNC connectors, Mini-VGA, DVI/Mini-DVI/Micro-DVI.	Analog	2048 × 1536 @ 85	The VGA connector was Introduced with IBM x86 machines, but became a universal analog display interface. Display Data Channel was later added to allow monitors to identify themselves to graphic cards, and graphic cards to modify monitor settings.	Successor analog protocols include SVGA, XGA, etc. DVI is a more modern digital alternative. Where BNC is used, available as 3 connectors with Sync on Green, or 5 connector Red / Green / Blue / Horizontal Sync / Vertical sync.
RGBHV	1987	Mac-II/Quadra DA15F	Analog	1152 × 870 @ 75	Macintosh	Mac-DA15F and Sun-13W3 were similar in capability to VGA. Some Sun machines used 4 or 5 BNC connectors to transfer video signal.
RGBHV	1990	13W3 DB13W3	Analog	1152 × 900 @ 76	Workstations. Sun, SGI et al.	Mac-DA15F and Sun-13W3 were similar in capability to VGA. Some Sun machines used 4 or 5 BNC connectors to transfer video signal.
Gigabit Video Interface (GVIF)	1996		Digital		Automotive	Sony proprietary
OpenLDI	1998	MDR36	LVDS Digital			
YP_{B}P_{R} (a.k.a. component video)	1990s	3 RCA or BNC connectors, Apple-AAUI, D-Terminal, SCART 21-pin	Analog	1920 × 1080 @ 60	Consumer electronics	Also referred to as Component video and YUV D-Terminal uses voltage levels to signal resolution.
Digital Visual Interface (DVI)	1999	DVI, Mini-DVI, Micro-DVI	Both	2560 × 1600 @ 60 3840 × 2400 @ 33	Video cards	Almost a ubiquitous computer display link. Uncompressed video only. High-bandwidth Digital Content Protection (HDCP) encryption is optional.
Digital Visual Interface (DVI)	2000	Apple Display Connector (ADC)	Both	2560 × 1600 @ 60	Apple Inc. Macintoshes and monitors	Proprietary connector designed to combine DVI-I, USB, and monitor power
Serial digital interface (SDI)	2003	BNC	Digital	From 143 Mbit/s to 12 Gbit/s, depending on variant. 480i, 576i, 480p, 576p, 720p, 1080i, 1080p, UHDTV1, UHDTV2	Broadcast video. Variants include SD-SDI, HD-SDI, Dual Link HD-SDI, 3G-SDI, 6G-SDI, 12G-SDI.	
High-Definition Multimedia Interface (HDMI)	2003	19 pin HDMI; Type A/C	Digital	10240 x 4320 @ 120 (version 2.1)	Many A/V systems and video cards (including motherboards with IGP)	High-bandwidth Digital Content Protection (HDCP) encryption is mandatory.
DisplayPort	2007	20-pin (external); 32-pin (internal); USB-C	LVDS Digital	10240 × 4320 @ 60 15360 × 8640 @ 60 (version 2.0)	Apple Inc. Lenovo, HP, and Dell systems and monitors ATI RV670 based graphics cards and NVIDIA G92 graphics cards (both as OEM optional implementations)	DisplayPort introduced the 128-bit AES to replace HDCP. DisplayPort version 1.1 added support for HDCP.
DiiVA	2008	13-pin	Digital	2560 × 1600 @ 75; 4096 × 2160 @ 24	A/V systems	High-bandwidth Digital Content Protection (HDCP).
HDBaseT	2010	8P8C	Digital	4096 × 2160 @ 24	A/V systems, data at 10.2 Gbit/s, power up to 100 watts	
CoaXPress	2010	BNC connector, DIN 1.0/2.3	Digital		Machine vision and industrial cameras	Supports 20.83 Mbit/s uplink channel and power over the same coaxial cable
Mobile High-Definition Link (MHL)	2010	5 pin	Digital	1920 × 1080 @ 60; 3840 × 2160 @ 30 (version 3.0); 7680 × 4320 @ 120 (superMHL)	Connecting mobile devices to TVs	Supports High-bandwidth Digital Content Protection (HDCP)

== See also ==
- Computer display standard
