= DD-15 =

DD-15 may refer to:

- ROCS Han Yang (DD-15), several ships of the name
  - ROCS Han Yang (DD-15) (Benson class), a destroyer acquired by the Republic of China Navy in 1954
  - ROCS Han Yang (DD-15) (Gearing class), a destroyer acquired by the Republic of China Navy in 1974
- USS Whipple (DD-15), a United States Navy Truxton-class destroyer commissioned in 1903 and decommissioned in 1919

== See also ==
- DDG-15, USS Berkeley
- DLG-15, USS Preble
- DE15 (disambiguation)
- D15 (disambiguation)
