= MacBook Air (Intel-based) =

Line of ultraportable notebook computers by Apple

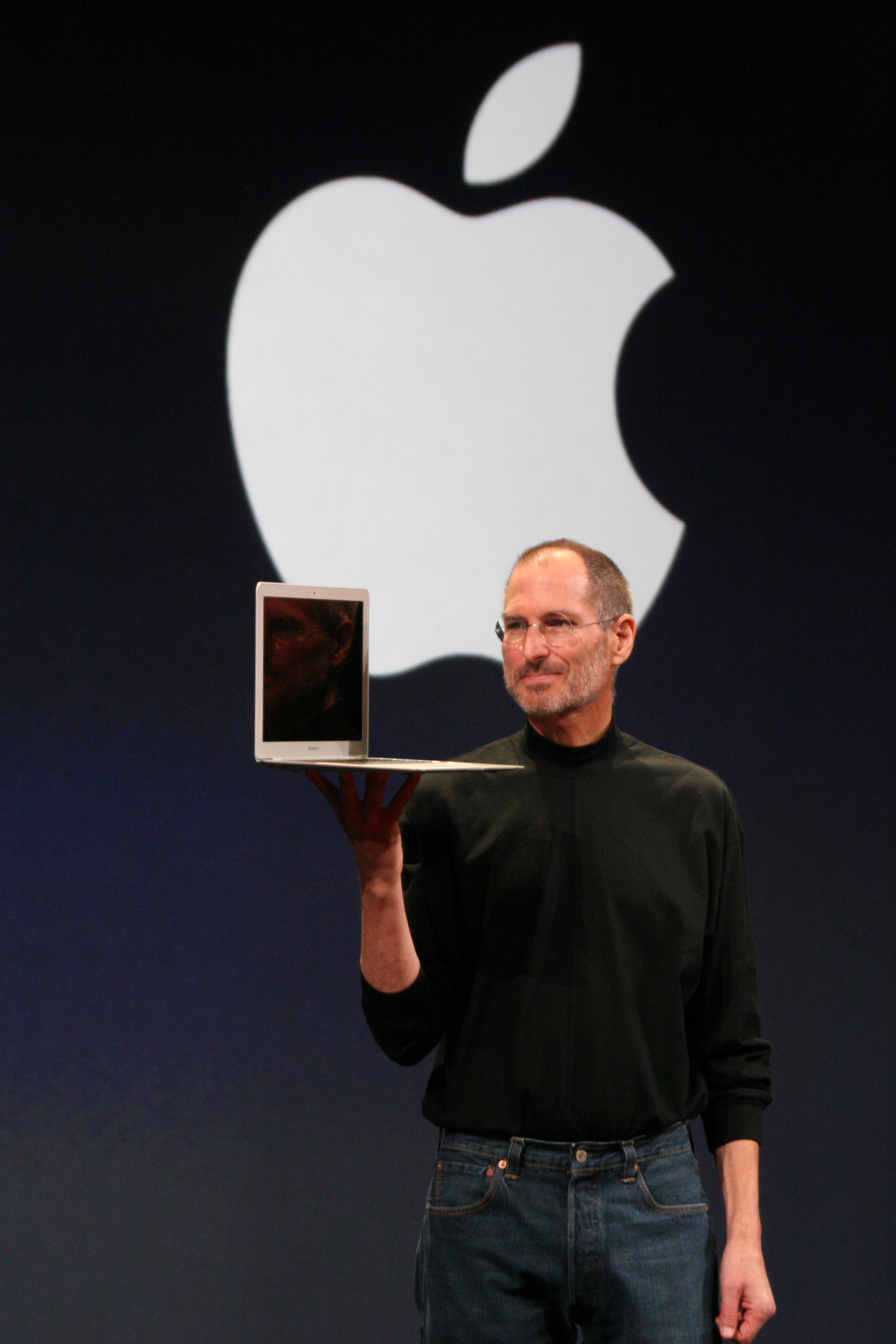
- Steve Jobs showing the first MacBook Air at Apple's 2008 keynote address
- Developer: Apple
- Product family: Macintosh; MacBook
- Type: Subnotebook
- Released: January 29, 2008; 18 years ago (first model); March 18, 2020; 6 years ago (last model)
- Discontinued: November 10, 2020; 5 years ago
- Operating system: macOS
- Successor: MacBook Air (Apple silicon)
- Related: MacBook, MacBook Pro
- Website: apple.com/macbook-air

The Intel-based MacBook Air is a discontinued line of notebook computers developed and manufactured by Apple from 2008 to 2020. The Air was originally positioned above the previous MacBook line as a premium ultraportable. Since then, the original MacBook's discontinuation in 2012 and lowered prices on subsequent iterations made the Air Apple's entry-level notebook.

The MacBook Air was introduced in January 2008 with a 13.3-inch screen, and was promoted as the world's thinnest notebook, opening a laptop category known as the ultrabook family. Apple released a redesigned MacBook Air in October 2010, with a redesigned tapered chassis, standard solid-state storage, and added a smaller 11.6-inch version. Later revisions added Intel Core i5 or i7 processors and Thunderbolt. The Retina MacBook Air was released in October 2018, with reduced dimensions, a Retina display, and combination USB-C/Thunderbolt 3 ports for data and power.

The Intel-based MacBook Air was discontinued on November 10, 2020 following the release of the first MacBook Air with Apple silicon based on the Apple M1 processor.

== Original (2008–2009) ==
Steve Jobs introduced the MacBook Air during Apple's keynote address at the 2008 Macworld conference on January 15, 2008. The original MacBook Air was a 13.3-inch model, initially promoted as the world's thinnest notebook at 1.9 cm (a previous record holder, 2005's Toshiba Portege R200, was 1.98 cm high). It featured a custom Intel Merom CPU and Intel GMA GPU which were 40% as big as the standard chip package. It also featured an anti-glare LED backlit display, a full-size keyboard, and a large trackpad that responded to multi-touch gestures such as pinching, swiping, and rotating. Since the release of Snow Leopard, the trackpad has also supported handwriting recognition of Chinese characters.

The MacBook Air was the first subcompact notebook offered by Apple after the 12-inch PowerBook G4 discontinued in 2006. It was also Apple's first computer with an optional solid-state drive. It was Apple's first notebook since the PowerBook 2400c without a built-in removable media drive. To read optical disks, users could either purchase an external USB drive such as Apple's SuperDrive or use the bundled Remote Disc software to access the drive of another computer wirelessly that has the program installed. Either option can also be used to reinstall the system software from the included installation DVD. Remote Disc supports booting over a network, so the Air can boot from its installation DVD in another computer's drive if Remote Install Mac OS X is running on that computer. The software does not allow playing video DVDs or audio CDs, or installing Windows; for these capabilities, an external USB drive is required. More recent versions of OS X replaced the installation DVD with a USB flash drive containing the software, eliminating the need for remote installation. The MacBook Air also does without a FireWire port, Ethernet port, line-in, and a Kensington Security Slot.

On October 14, 2008, a new model was announced with a low-voltage Penryn processor and Nvidia GeForce graphics. Storage capacity was increased to a 128 GB SSD or a 120 GB HDD, and the micro-DVI video port was replaced by the Mini DisplayPort. A mid-2009 version featured slightly higher battery capacity and a faster Penryn CPU.

=== Design ===
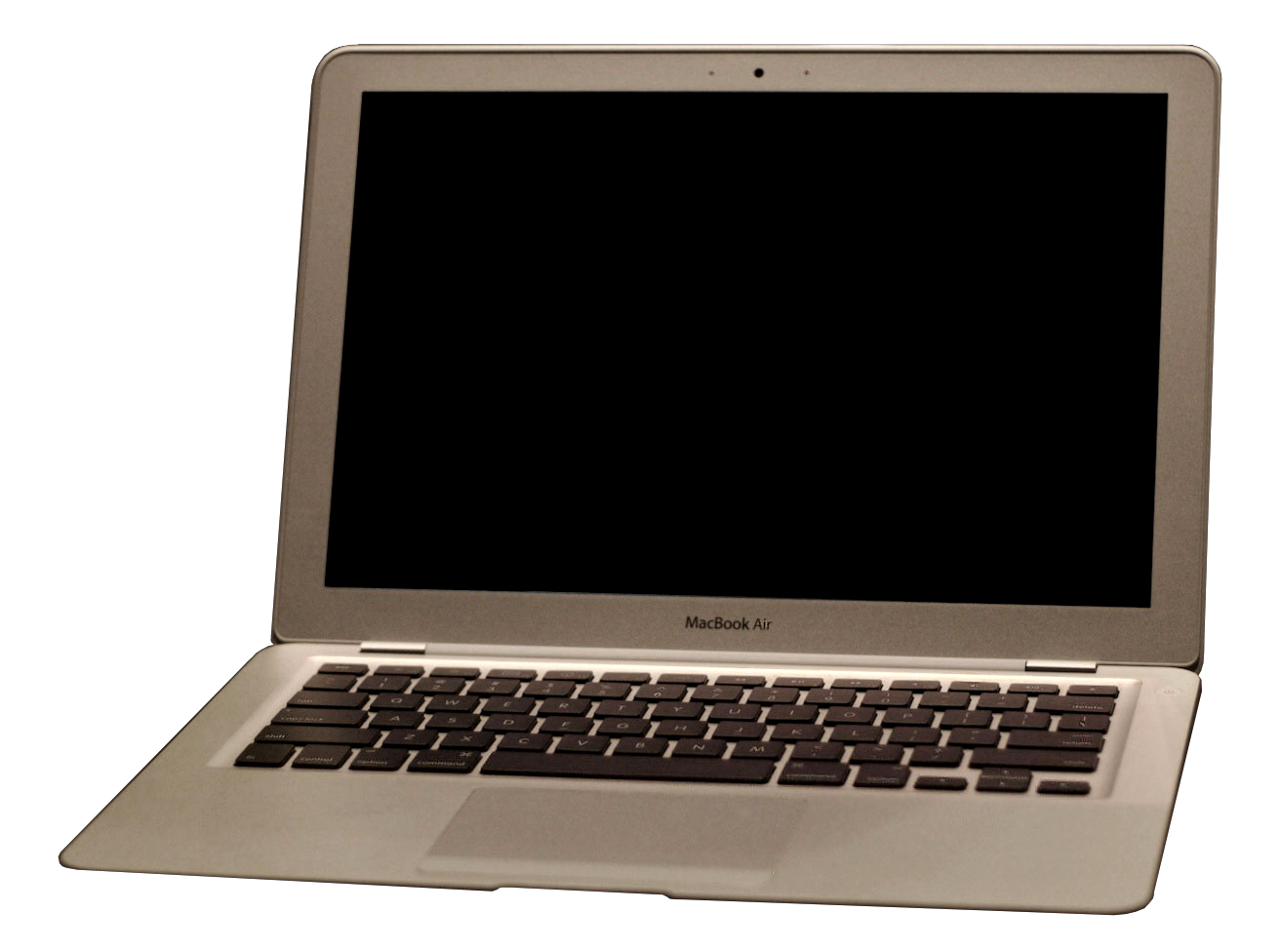
The original MacBook Air

Apple incorporated several features in the design of the MacBook Air, such as the reduction of lead to make it more environmentally friendly. The MacBook Air contains no BFRs and PVC wiring, meets Energy Star 5.0 requirements, has a recyclable enclosure, and is rated EPEAT Gold. Its display is made with arsenic-free glass and contains no mercury.

=== Reception ===
On its introduction, the MacBook Air received mixed reviews which praised its portability, but criticized the compromises it made in terms of features. The full-sized keyboard, lightness, thinness, and Multi-Touch trackpad were appreciated in reviews, while the limited configuration options and ports, slow speed, non-user-replaceable battery, small hard drive, and price were criticized. The flip-down hatch on the side of the original MacBook Air was a tight fit for some headphone plugs and USB devices, requiring users to purchase an extension cable. Apple removed the flip-down hatch on the late 2010 model in favor of open ports like those on the MacBook Pro.

Some users have complained of CPU lockup caused by overheating. Apple released a software update in early March 2008 to fix the problem with mixed results: the deactivation of one CPU core was corrected; however, some users reported that the runaway kernel problem continued. The problem is aggravated by system-intensive tasks such as video playback or video chatting.

ArsTechnica found "moderate" performance improvements of the 64 GB (Note: In this article, the conventional prefixes for computer storage denote base-10 values whereby kilobyte (KB) = 10^{3} bytes, megabyte (MB) = 10^{6} bytes and gigabyte (GB) = 10^{9} bytes.) solid-state drive of the original Air over the standard 80 GB hard drive in tests.

==== "World's thinnest notebook" ====
At the launch of the MacBook Air in January 2008, Steve Jobs said it was the "world's thinnest notebook". This was true, but more important was the fact that the MacBook Air was much thinner than mainstream laptops at the time. Its total component integration and use of an entirely new class of Intel processors with a lower TDP and higher integration than previously available made it the first of a new wave of thin performance laptops. Over the years, Apple has removed the claim of being "the world's thinnest notebook" from their marketing materials as other, similarly thin laptops have come to market.

=== Technical specifications ===
According to Apple, all of these models are obsolete. (Note: Apple products that have been discontinued for 7 years and no longer receive hardware support or spare parts)

		Original (early 2008)	Late 2008		Mid 2009	
Component / processor		Merom Intel Core 2 Duo	Penryn Intel Core 2 Duo			
Timeline	Announced	January 15, 2008	October 14, 2008		June 8, 2009	
Timeline	Released	January 30, 2008	[data missing]		[data missing]	
Timeline	Discontinued	October 14, 2008	June 8, 2009		October 20, 2010	
Timeline	Unsupported	October 2014	October 2018			
Model	Model identifier	MacBookAir1,1	MacBookAir2,1			
Model	Model number (on underside)	A1237	A1304			
Model	Part number (order number)	MB003	MB543	MB940	MC233	MC234
Model	MSRP (US$)	$1799	$1799	$2499	$1499	$1799
Display (glossy)		13.3-inch, native 1280 × 800 pixels (16:10, 113 ppi) TN. 6-bit color panel, lower resolutions supported				
Performance	Processor	1.6 GHz Intel Core 2 Duo Merom (P7500) with 4 MB on-chip L2 cache Optional 1.8 GHz (P7700) Intel Core 2 Duo	1.6 GHz Intel Core 2 Duo Penryn (SL9300) with 6 MB on-chip L2 cache	1.86 GHz Intel Core 2 Duo Penryn (SL9400) with 6 MB on-chip L2 cache		2.13 GHz Intel Core 2 Duo Penryn (SL9600) with 6 MB on-chip L2 cache
Performance	Front-side bus / DMI	800 MHz	1066 MHz			
Performance	Memory	2 GB (Note: In this article, the conventional prefixes for computer RAM denote base-2 values whereby kilobyte (KB) = 2^{10} bytes, megabyte (MB) = 2^{20} bytes and gigabyte (GB) = 2^{30} bytes.) of 667 MHz DDR2 SDRAM	2 GB of 1066 MHz DDR3 SDRAM			
Performance	Graphics	Intel GMA X3100 using 144 MB of DDR2 SDRAM (shared with system memory) with Micro-DVI output	Nvidia GeForce 9400M using 256 MB of DDR3 SDRAM (shared with system memory) with Mini DisplayPort output			
Storage		80 GB 4200-rpm 1.8-inch PATA HDD or 64 GB SSD	120 GB 4200-rpm 1.8-inch SATA HDD	128 GB SSD	120 GB 4200-rpm 1.8-inch SATA HDD	128 GB SSD
Connectivity	Video camera	iSight (640 × 480)				
Connectivity	Wireless connectivity	Internal Wi-Fi 4 (802.11a/b/g and draft-n); Bluetooth 2.1 + EDR; Built-in infrared (IR) receiver for Apple Remote; Optional Apple USB Ethernet Adapter (Year 2008)				
Connectivity	Peripheral connections	1× USB 2.0; MagSafe; Micro-DVI video port DVI-D/VGA adapter included	1× USB 2.0; MagSafe; 1× Mini DisplayPort video port			
Connectivity	Audio	3.5 mm headphone jack Mono speaker				
Operating system	Minimum	Mac OS X 10.5 Leopard				
Operating system	Latest released	OS X 10.7 Lion	OS X 10.11 El Capitan			
Power	Battery (non-removable lithium-ion polymer)	37-watt-hour			40-watt-hour	
Power	Battery cycle count	300			500	
Appearance	Unit weight	3.0 lb (1.36 kg)				
Appearance	Dimensions	12.8 in (33 cm) wide × 8.94 in (23 cm) deep × 0.16 in (0.4 cm) to 0.76 in (1.9 cm) high (13")				

== Redesign (2010–2017) ==
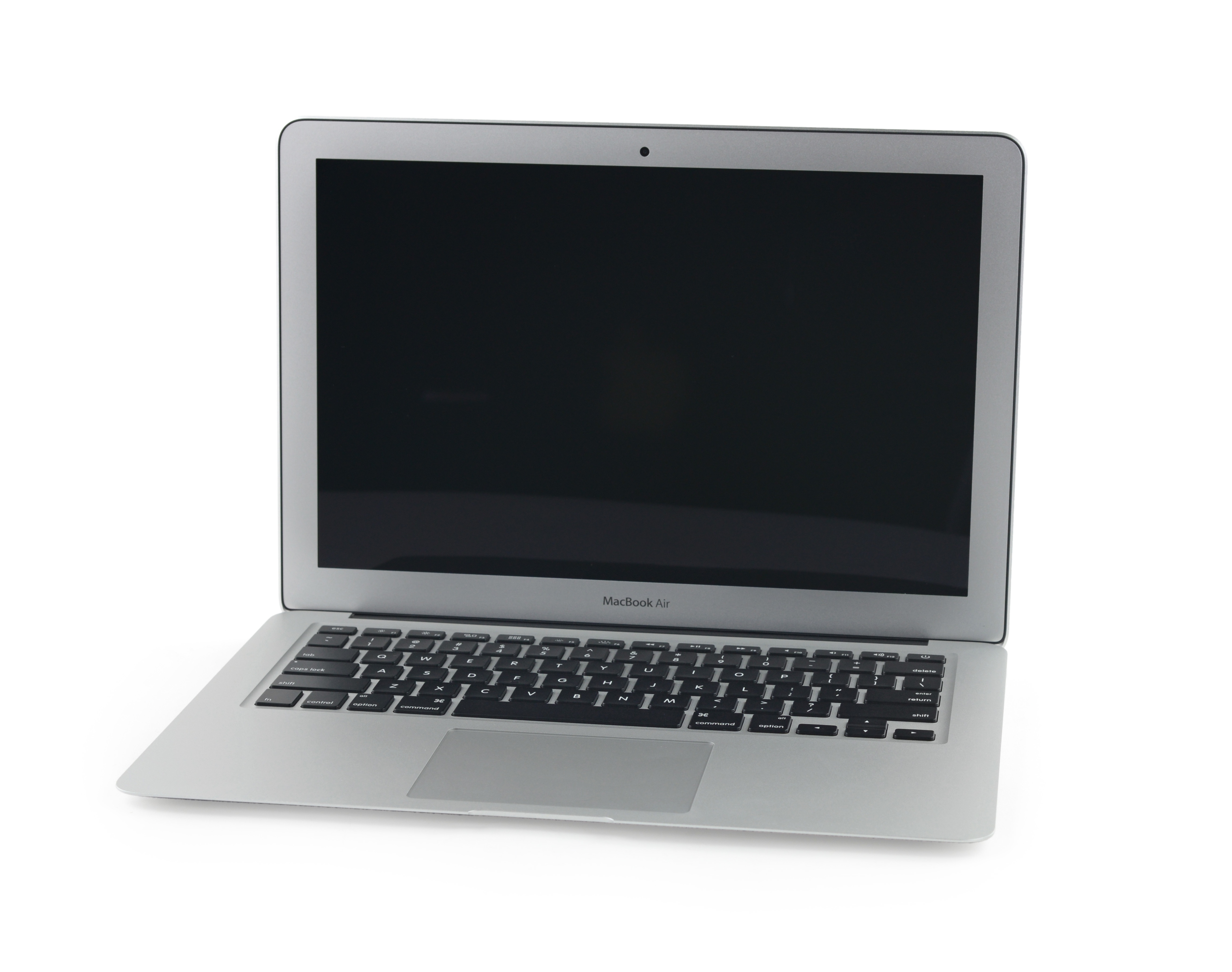
The redesigned 2010 model MacBook Air

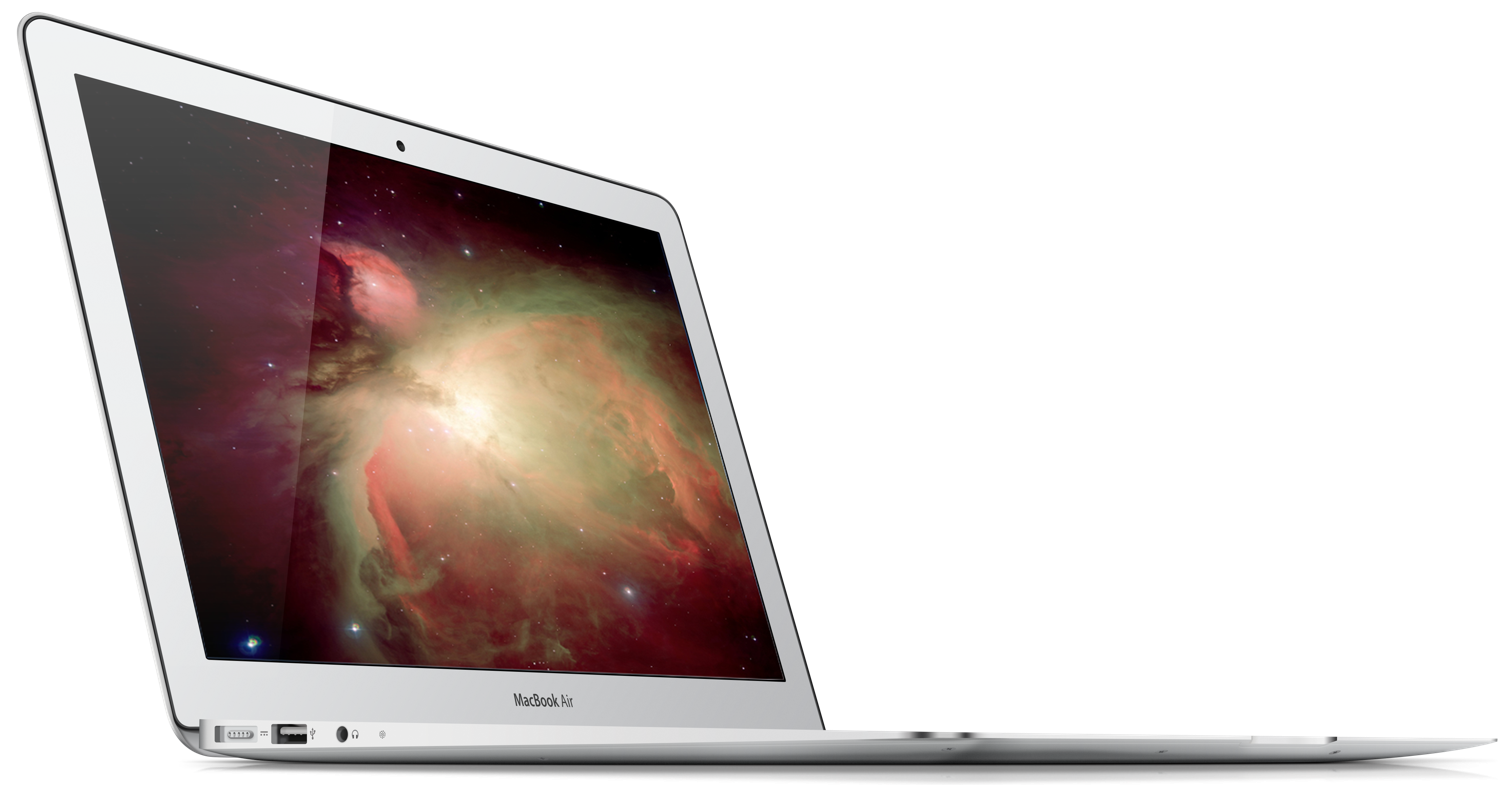
Left side of a MacBook Air (mid 2012). From left to right, MagSafe power connector, USB port, headphone jack and built-in microphone.

On October 20, 2010, Apple released a redesigned 13.3-inch model with a tapered enclosure, higher screen resolution, improved battery, a second USB port, stereo speakers, and standard solid state storage. An 11.6-inch model was introduced, offering reduced cost, weight, battery life, and performance relative to the 13.3-inch model, but better performance than typical netbooks of the time. Both 11-inch and 13-inch models had an analog audio output/headphone minijack supporting Apple earbuds with a microphone. The 13-inch model received a SDXC-capable SD Card slot.

On July 20, 2011, Apple released updated models, which also became Apple's entry-level notebooks due to lowered prices and the discontinuation of the white MacBook around the same time. The mid-2011 models were upgraded with Sandy Bridge dual-core Intel Core i5 and i7 processors, Intel HD Graphics 3000, backlit keyboards, Thunderbolt, and Bluetooth was upgraded to v4.0. Maximum storage options were increased up to 256 GB. These models use a less expensive "Eagle Ridge" Thunderbolt controller that provides two Thunderbolt channels (2 × 10 Gbit/s bidirectional), compared to the MacBook Pro which uses a "Light Ridge" controller that provides four Thunderbolt channels (4 × 10 Gbit/s bidirectional). This revision also replaced the Exposé (F3) key with a Mission Control key, and the Dashboard (F4) key with a Launchpad key.

On June 11, 2012, Apple updated the line with Intel Ivy Bridge dual-core Core i5 and i7 processors, HD Graphics 4000, faster memory and flash storage speeds, USB 3.0, an upgraded 720p FaceTime camera, and a thinner MagSafe 2 charging port.

On June 10, 2013, Apple updated the line with Haswell processors, Intel HD Graphics 5000, and 802.11ac Wi-Fi. The standard memory was upgraded to 4 GB, with a maximum configuration of 8 GB. Storage started at 128 GB SSD, with options for 256 GB and 512 GB. The Haswell considerably improved battery life from the previous models, and the models are capable of nine hours on the 11-inch model and 12 hours on the 13-inch model; a team of reviewers exceeded expected battery life ratings during their test. The mid-2013 model is second MacBook Air that supported nine macOS versions: OS X Mountain Lion 10.8 through macOS Big Sur 11.

In March 2015, the models were refreshed with Broadwell processors, Intel HD Graphics 6000, Thunderbolt 2, and faster storage and memory.

In 2017, the 13-inch model received a processor speed increase from 1.6 GHz to 1.8 GHz, while the 11-inch model was already discontinued on October 27, 2016. The 2017 model remained available for sale after Apple launched the Retina MacBook Air in 2018. It was sold until July 9, 2019, when it was discontinued following the announcement of the updated Retina MacBook Air models. Before its discontinuation it was Apple's last notebook with USB Type-A ports, MagSafe (until it was reintroduced in 2021), a non-Retina display, and previously with a backlit rear Apple logo (until the introduction of the PROLED XDR MacBook Pro in 2026) and the startup chime (until the introduction of macOS Big Sur in 2020).

=== Design and upgradability ===
Although MacBook Air components are officially non-user-replaceable, third parties do sell replacement batteries and SSD upgrade kits. Both battery and SSD can be replaced opening the back of the case, but the RAM is soldered onto the motherboard and can not be upgraded. The flash memory has a 128 MB cache and a mSATA connection (updated to a proprietary PCIe interface) to the motherboard. Adaptors are available to fit standard M.2 2280 form factor SSDs. Firmware upgrades installed in macOS High Sierra are needed to support large SSDs.

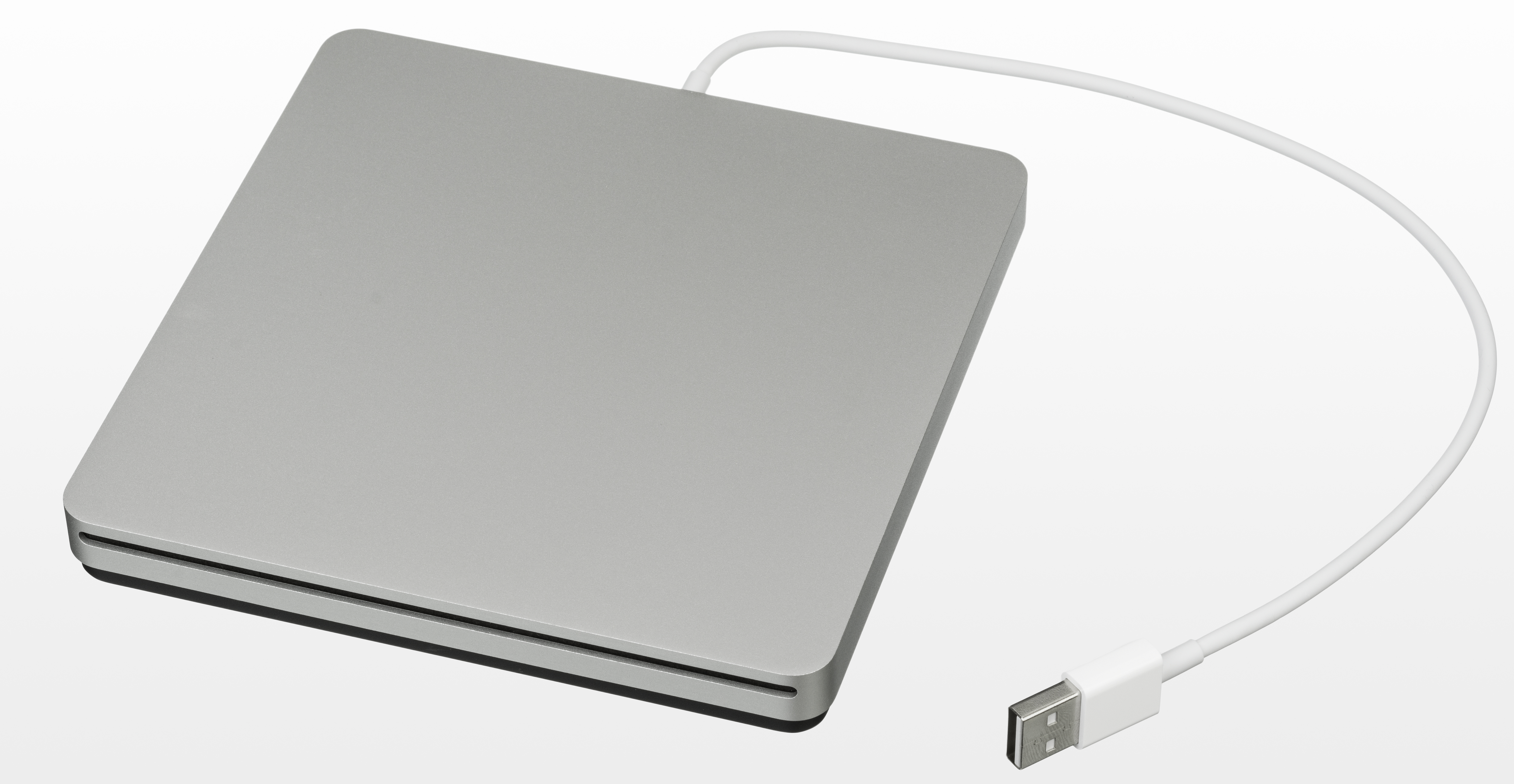
The optional Apple USB SuperDrive DVD drive

==== Issues ====
Due to a more mature manufacturing process, the CPUs in the 2010–2017 MacBook Air performs better under load, while the original models ran hotter—the processor needed to be throttled to avoid overheating and this further degraded performance.

On October 17, 2013, Apple announced a replacement program for the 64 GB and 128 GB MacBook Air flash storage drives installed in Air systems purchased between June 2012 and June 2013.

=== Reception ===
==== Comparison with iPad and netbooks ====
Although the 11-inch Air is only 0.6 pounds lighter than the 13-inch Air, the biggest difference is the footprint which gives each model a distinct category; the 13-inch Air is much closer in size to most other conventional laptops, while the 11-inch Air is almost small enough to fit in a space that can hold an iPad.

The 11-inch MacBook Air carried the desirable essential attributes of a netbook, but without the drawbacks of a slower processor and less capable operating system, albeit at a higher price. At the low end, Apple introduced the iPad—a different form factor than the netbook, but with improved computing capabilities and lower production cost. Both of these led to a decline in netbook sales, and most PC manufacturers have consequently discontinued their netbook lines in response. Capitalizing on the success of the MacBook Air, Intel promoted ultrabooks as a new high-mobility standard, which has been hailed by some analysts as succeeding where netbooks failed.

==== Intel's ultrabook competition ====
Intel developed a set of specifications for the ultrabook, a higher-end type of subnotebook produced by various PC manufacturers and usually running Windows. Competing directly with the Air, ultrabooks are intended to reduce size and weight, and extend battery life without compromising performance.

Through July 1, 2013, the MacBook Air took in 56 percent of all ultrabook sales in the United States, despite being one of the higher-priced competitors. Apple had previously dominated the premium PC market, in 2009 having a 91 percent market share for PCs priced at more than $1,000, according to NPD, and ultrabooks were an attempt by other PC manufacturers to move in on Apple's turf. While Apple's MacBook lines were not immune to this consumer trend towards mobile devices, they still managed to ship 2.8 million MacBooks in Q2 2012 (the majority of which were the MacBook Air) compared to 500,000 total ultrabooks, despite there being dozens of ultrabooks from various manufacturers on the market while Apple only offered 11-inch and 13-inch models of the MacBook Air. Forrester Research analyst Frank Gillett attributes Apple's increased success in the enterprise market to the 2010 MacBook Air and the iPad.

While several ultrabooks were able to claim individual distinctions such as being the lightest or thinnest, the MacBook Air was regarded by reviewers as the best all-around ultrabook in regard to "OS X experience, full keyboard, superior trackpad, Thunderbolt connector and the higher-quality, all-aluminum unibody construction".

Microsoft's Surface Pro 2 has a similar size and price to the 11-inch MacBook Air; then-Apple CEO Tim Cook has criticized the Surface Pro and other ultrabook hybrids running the touch-based Windows 8, that attempt to combine PC and tablet functionality in one device, saying that such devices were confusing like trying to "combine a fridge and a toaster".

When released in October 2010, the 13-inch model's screen resolution was higher than the average 1366×768 screens of similar sized laptops. However, by 2013, with many premium ultrabooks having high resolution screens (1080p or greater) as standard or upgrades, the MacBook Air was increasingly criticized for sticking with a low-resolution screen. Many in the tech community had expected Apple to release a MacBook Air with Retina Display by the summer of 2013, similar to the MacBook Pro Retina which came out in 2012. The October 2013 refresh of the 13-inch MacBook Pro Retina, with a slimmer chassis and a lower price point, was mentioned as a potential MacBook Air alternative as the battery life is not much shorter while not being considerably bulkier. Apple released an entry-level version of the 13-inch MacBook Pro on October 27, 2016, which was specifically targeted towards MacBook Air users. A Retina MacBook Air was released in late 2018.

The 11.6-inch MacBook Air, introduced in October 2010, is only slightly larger and heavier (when closed) than the iPad 2. The 11.6-inch Air has been regarded as thin and light compared to other ultraportables, such as the Sony VAIO Z and the 11-inch Samsung Series 9.

As of 2013, several ultrabooks such as the Sony VAIO Pro have managed smaller dimensions than the MacBook Air by using carbon fiber construction.

=== Technical specifications ===
Obsolete	Vintage

Model		Late 2010		Mid 2011		Mid 2011 (education only)	Mid 2012		Mid 2012 (education only)	Mid 2013		Early 2014		Early 2015		2017	
Component / processor		Penryn Intel Core		Sandy Bridge Intel Core			Ivy Bridge Intel Core			Haswell Intel Core				Broadwell Intel Core			
Released date	11"	October 20, 2010		July 20, 2011		—N/a	June 11, 2012		—N/a	June 10, 2013		April 29, 2014		March 9, 2015		—N/a	
Released date	13"	October 20, 2010		July 20, 2011		February 12, 2012	June 11, 2012		September 12, 2012	June 10, 2013		April 29, 2014		March 9, 2015		June 5, 2017	
Discontinued date	11"	July 20, 2011		June 11, 2012		—N/a	June 10, 2013		—N/a	April 29, 2014		March 9, 2015		October 27, 2016		—N/a	
Discontinued date	13"	July 20, 2011		June 11, 2012		June 11, 2012	June 10, 2013		February 13, 2013	April 29, 2014		March 9, 2015		June 5, 2017		July 9, 2019 / January 8, 2021	
Unsupported date	11"	November 12, 2020				—N/a	November 30, 2022		—N/a	September 26, 2023				September 16, 2024		—N/a	
Unsupported date	13"	November 12, 2020				November 12, 2020	November 30, 2022		November 30, 2022	September 26, 2023				September 16, 2024		September 16, 2024	
Model identifier	11"	MacBookAir3,1		MacBookAir4,1		—N/a	MacBookAir5,1		—N/a	MacBookAir6,1				MacBookAir7,1		—N/a	
Model identifier	13"	MacBookAir3,2		MacBookAir4,2			MacBookAir5,2			MacBookAir6,2				MacBookAir7,2			
Model number (on underside)	11"	A1370				—N/a	A1465		—N/a	A1465						—N/a	
Model number (on underside)	13"	A1369					A1466										
Part/order number (price in US$)	11"	MC505 ($999)	MC506 ($1199)	MC968 ($999)	MC969 ($1199)	—N/a	MD223 ($999)	MD224 ($1099)	—N/a	MD711/A ($999)	MD712/A ($1199)	MD711/B ($899)	MD712/B ($1099)	MJVM2 ($899)	MJVP2 ($1099)	—N/a	
Part/order number (price in US$)	13"	MC503 ($1299)	MC504 ($1599)	MC965 ($1299)	MC966 ($1599)	MD508 (pack of five for $4995)	MD231 ($1199)	MD232 ($1499)	MD628 (pack of five for $4995)	MD760/A ($1099)	MD761/A ($1299)	MD760/B ($999)	MD761/B ($1199)	MJVE2 Starting April 19, 2016: MMGF2 ($999)	MJVG2 Starting April 19, 2016: MMGG2 ($1199)	MQD32 ($999)	MQD42 ($1199)
Processor	11"	1.4 GHz Intel Core 2 Duo (SU9400) Penryn with 3 MB on-chip L2 cache	1.6 GHz Intel Core 2 Duo (SU9600) Penryn with 3 MB on-chip L2 cache	1.6 GHz 2-core Intel Core i5 (2467M) Sandy Bridge with 3 MB shared L3 cache Optional 1.8 GHz 2-core Intel Core i7 (2677M) Sandy Bridge with 4 MB shared L3 cache (+$150)		—N/a	1.7 GHz 2-core Intel Core i5 (3317U) Ivy Bridge with 3 MB shared L3 cache Optional 2.0 GHz 2-core Intel Core i7 (3667U) Ivy Bridge with 4 MB shared L3 cache (+$150 for MD224, +$100 for MD232)		—N/a	1.3 GHz 2-core Intel Core i5 (4250U) Haswell with 3 MB shared L3 cache Optional 1.7 GHz 2-core Intel Core i7 (4650U) Haswell with 4 MB shared L3 cache (+$150)		1.4 GHz 2-core Intel Core i5 (4260U) Haswell with 3 MB shared L3 cache Optional 1.7 GHz 2-core Intel Core i7 (4650U) Haswell with 4 MB shared L3 cache (+$150)		1.6 GHz 2-core Intel Core i5 (5250U) Broadwell with 3 MB shared L3 cache Optional 2.2 GHz 2-core Intel Core i7 (5650U) Broadwell with 4 MB shared L3 cache (+$150)		—N/a	
Processor	13"	1.86 GHz Intel Core 2 Duo (SL9400) Penryn with 6 MB on-chip L2 cache	2.13 GHz Intel Core 2 Duo (SL9600) Penryn with 6 MB on-chip L2 cache	1.7 GHz 2-core Intel Core i5 (2557M) Sandy Bridge with 3 MB shared L3 cache Optional 1.8 GHz 2-core Intel Core i7 (2677M) Sandy Bridge with 4 MB shared L3 cache (+$100)		1.6 GHz 2-core Intel Core i5 (2467M) Sandy Bridge with 3 MB shared L3 cache	1.8 GHz 2-core Intel Core i5 (3427U) Ivy Bridge with 3 MB shared L3 cache Optional 2.0 GHz 2-core Intel Core i7 (3667U) Ivy Bridge with 4 MB shared L3 cache (+$150 for MD224, +$100 for MD232)		1.7 GHz 2-core Intel Core i5 (3317U) Ivy Bridge with 3 MB shared L3 cache	1.3 GHz 2-core Intel Core i5 (4250U) Haswell with 3 MB shared L3 cache Optional 1.7 GHz 2-core Intel Core i7 (4650U) Haswell with 4 MB shared L3 cache (+$150)		1.4 GHz 2-core Intel Core i5 (4260U) Haswell with 3 MB shared L3 cache Optional 1.7 GHz 2-core Intel Core i7 (4650U) Haswell with 4 MB shared L3 cache (+$150)		1.6 GHz 2-core Intel Core i5 (5250U) Broadwell with 3 MB shared L3 cache Optional 2.2 GHz 2-core Intel Core i7 (5650U) Broadwell with 4 MB shared L3 cache (+$150)		1.8 GHz 2-core Intel Core i5 (5350U) Broadwell with 3 MB shared L3 cache Optional 2.2 GHz 2-core Intel Core i7 (5650U) Broadwell with 4 MB shared L3 cache	
Front-side bus / DMI	11"	800 MHz				—N/a	Intel Direct Media Interface, 5.0 GT/s		—N/a	Intel Direct Media Interface, 5.0 GT/s							—N/a
Front-side bus / DMI	13"	1066 MHz		Intel Direct Media Interface, 5.0 GT/s													
Graphics (shared with system memory)	11"	Nvidia GeForce 320M using 256 MB DDR3 SDRAM with Mini DisplayPort output		Intel HD Graphics 3000 processor using 256 MB DDR3 SDRAM		—N/a	Intel HD Graphics 4000 processor with up to 512 MB DDR3L SDRAM shared from main memory		—N/a	Intel HD Graphics 5000 processor with up to 1.5 GB LPDDR3 SDRAM shared from main memory				Intel HD Graphics 6000 processor with up to 1.5 GB LPDDR3 SDRAM shared from main memory			—N/a
Graphics (shared with system memory)	13"	Nvidia GeForce 320M using 256 MB DDR3 SDRAM with Mini DisplayPort output		Intel HD Graphics 3000 processor using 384 MB DDR3 SDRAM		Intel HD Graphics 3000 processor using 256 MB DDR3 SDRAM	Intel HD Graphics 4000 processor with up to 512 MB DDR3L SDRAM shared from main memory		Intel HD Graphics 4000 processor with up to 512 MB DDR3L SDRAM shared from main memory	Intel HD Graphics 5000 processor with up to 1.5 GB LPDDR3 SDRAM shared from main memory				Intel HD Graphics 6000 processor with up to 1.5 GB LPDDR3 SDRAM shared from main memory			Intel HD Graphics 6000 processor with up to 1.5 GB LPDDR3 SDRAM shared from main memory
Memory		2 GB (IEC defined GiB) 1066 MHz DDR3 SDRAM; Optional 4 GB (+$100)		2 GB (11") 1333 MHz DDR3 SDRAM; Optional 4 GB (+$100) 4 GB (13") 1333 MHz DDR3 SDRAM	4 GB 1333 MHz DDR3 SDRAM	2 GB 1333 MHz DDR3 SDRAM	4 GB 1600 MHz DDR3L SDRAM; Optional 8 GB (+$100)		4 GB 1600 MHz DDR3L SDRAM	4 GB 1600 MHz LPDDR3 SDRAM; Optional 8 GB (+$100)				4 GB 1600 MHz LPDDR3 SDRAM; Optional 8 GB Starting April 19, 2016: 8 GB standard for the 13" version		8 GB 1600 MHz LPDDR3 SDRAM	
Solid-state drive (on all models)	11"	64 GB	128 GB	64 GB	128 GB; Optional 256 GB (+$300)	—N/a	64 GB	128 GB; Optional 256 +$300 or 512 GB (+$800 both for MD224 model only)	—N/a	128 GB	256 GB; Optional 512 GB (+$300)	128 GB	256 GB; Optional 512 GB (+$300)	128 GB	256 GB; Optional 512 GB (+$300)	—N/a	
Solid-state drive (on all models)	13"	128 GB	256 GB	128 GB	256 GB	64 GB	128 GB	256 GB; Optional 512 GB (+$500)	64 GB	128 GB	256 GB; Optional 512 GB (+$300)	128 GB	256 GB; Optional 512 GB (+$300)	128 GB	256 GB; Optional 512 GB (+$300)	128 GB (MQD32)	256 GB (MQD42); Optional 512 GB
Solid-state drive (on all models)	Type	Solid-state drive (SSD)								PCIe-based SSD							
Display (glossy)	11"	11.6", native 1366 × 768 pixels (16:9, 135 ppi) TN. 6-bit color panel, Lower resolutions supported				—N/a	11.6", native 1366 × 768 pixels (16:9, 135 ppi) TN. 6-bit color panel, Lower resolutions supported		—N/a	11.6", native 1366 × 768 pixels (16:9, 135 ppi) TN. 6-bit color panel, Lower resolutions supported						—N/a	
Display (glossy)	13"	13.3", native 1440 × 900 pixels (16:10, 128 ppi) TN. 6-bit color panel, Lower resolutions supported															
Video camera		iSight (480p)					FaceTime HD (720p)										
Audio		3.5 mm headphone jack Stereo speakers															
Connectivity		Internal Wi-Fi 4 (802.11 a/b/g/n) (Broadcom BCM43224, dual-band 300 Mbit/s)								Internal Wi-Fi 5 (802.11 a/b/g/n/ac) (Broadcom BCM4360-based, dual-band 867 Mbit/s)							
Connectivity		Bluetooth 2.1 + EDR		Bluetooth 4.0													
Connectivity		Optional Apple USB Ethernet 100 Mbit Adapter		Optional Apple USB Ethernet 100 Mbit Adapter; Optional Apple Thunderbolt to Gigabit Ethernet Adapter; Optional Apple Thunderbolt to FireWire 800 Adapter													
Peripheral connections		2× USB 2.0					2× USB 3.0										
Peripheral connections		1× Mini DisplayPort video port		1× Thunderbolt port										1× Thunderbolt 2 port Up to 3840 × 2160 @ 60 Hz			
Peripheral connections		MagSafe					MagSafe 2										
Peripheral connections		1× SDXC card slot (13" only)															
Operating system	Minimum	Mac OS X 10.6 Snow Leopard		OS X 10.7 Lion						OS X 10.8 Mountain Lion		OS X 10.9 Mavericks		OS X 10.10 Yosemite		macOS 10.12 Sierra (Note: Although these shipped with Sierra, OS X 10.11 El Capitan can also be installed since the 2017 and 2015 models use the same firmware)	
Operating system	Latest release	macOS 10.13 High Sierra					macOS 10.15 Catalina			macOS 11 Big Sur				macOS 12 Monterey			
Battery	11"	35-watt-hour				—N/a	35-watt-hour		—N/a	38-watt-hour						—N/a	
Battery	13"	50-watt-hour								54-watt-hour							
Battery	Type	Non-removable lithium-ion polymer															
Battery	Cycles	1000															
Unit weight	11"	2.38 lb (1.08 kg)				—N/a	2.38 lb (1.08 kg)		—N/a	2.38 lb (1.08 kg)						—N/a	
Unit weight	13"	2.96 lb (1.34 kg)															
Dimensions	11"	11.8 in (30 cm) wide × 7.56 in (19.2 cm) deep × 0.11 in (0.3 cm) × 0.68 in (1.7 cm) high				—N/a	11.8 in (30 cm) wide × 7.56 in (19.2 cm) deep × 0.11 in (0.3 cm) × 0.68 in (1.7 cm) high		—N/a	11.8 in (30 cm) wide × 7.56 in (19.2 cm) deep × 0.11 in (0.3 cm) × 0.68 in (1.7 cm) high						—N/a	
Dimensions	13"	12.8 in (33 cm) wide × 8.94 in (22.7 cm) deep × 0.11 in (0.3 cm) × 0.68 in (1.7 cm) high															

== Retina (2018–2020) ==
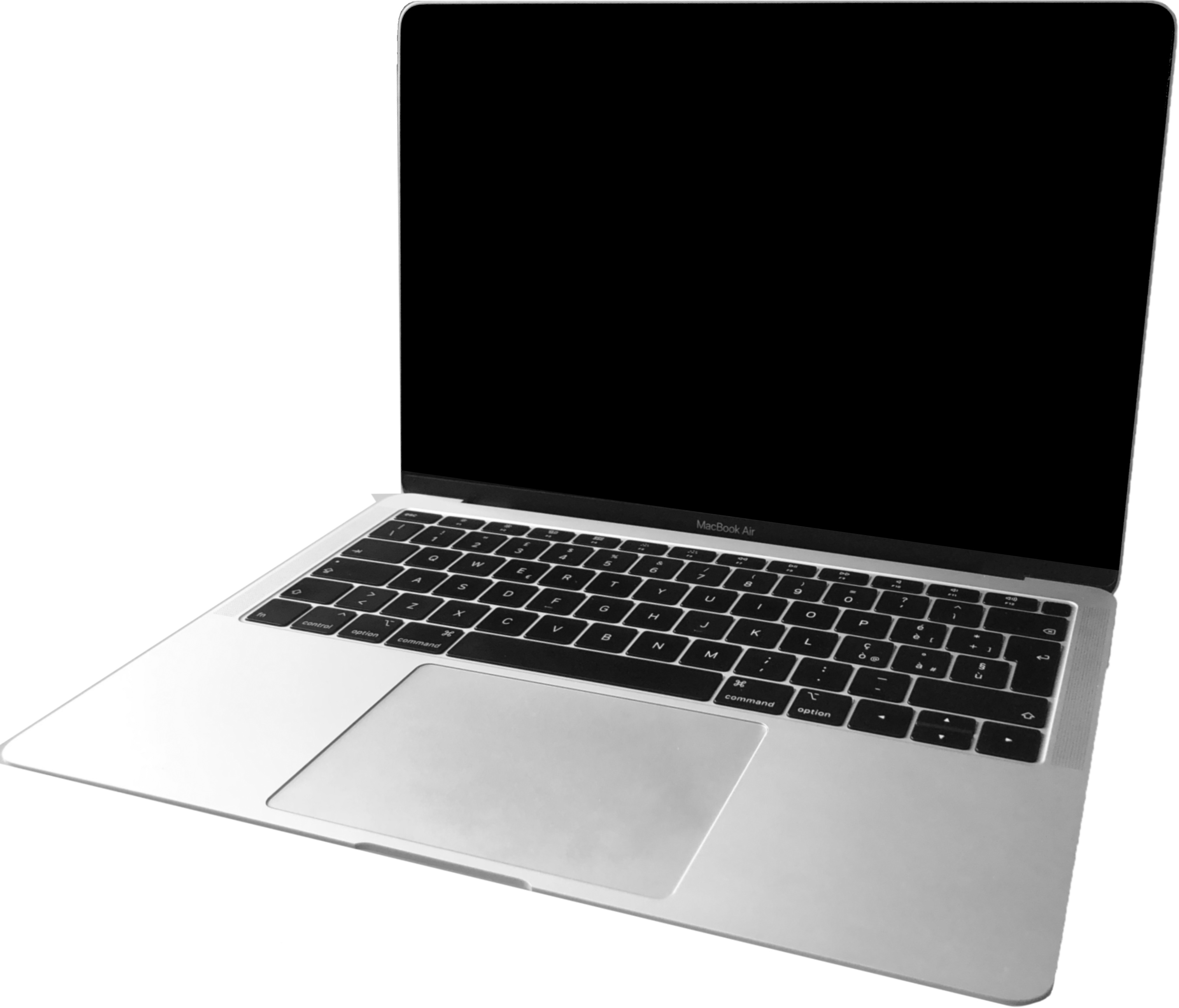
Retina MacBook Air (2018)

On October 30, 2018, Apple released the Retina MacBook Air, with Amber Lake processors, a 13.3-inch Retina display with a resolution of 2560×1600 pixels, Touch ID, a Force Touch trackpad, and two combination USB-C 3.1 gen 2/Thunderbolt 3 ports plus one audio jack. The screen displays 48% more color and the bezels are 50% narrower than the previous non-Retina models, and occupies 17% less volume. Thickness is reduced to 15.6 mm and weight to 1.25 kg (2.75 pounds). It is available in three finishes: silver, space gray, and gold. Unlike the 2011–2017 models, this model cannot be configured with an Intel Core i7 processor, possibly because Intel never released the i7-8510Y CPU that would have been used.

The base 2018 model comes with 8 GB of 2133 MHz LPDDR3 RAM, 128 GB SSD, Intel Core i5 processor (1.6 GHz base clock, with Turbo up to 3.6 GHz) and Intel UHD Graphics 617.

Apple released updated models in July 2019 with True Tone display technology using the same components as the mid-2019 MacBook Pro. A test found that the 256 GB SSD in the 2019 model has a 35% lower read speed than the 256 GB SSD in the 2018 model, though the write speed is slightly faster.

Updated models were released in March 2020 with Ice Lake processors, updated graphics, support for 6K output to run the Pro Display XDR, and replaced the butterfly keyboard with a Magic Keyboard design similar to that found in the 2019 16-inch MacBook Pro.

=== Design ===
The Retina MacBook Air follows the design of the 2010–2017 models with a tapered aluminum enclosure, but takes some design elements from the Retina MacBook and MacBook Pro, such as a flush display with black bezels and a glossy opaque Apple logo on the rear, and an edge-to-edge trackpad.

Apple repair expert Louis Rossmann has criticised the Retina MacBook Air's hardware layout, noting that the fan's position makes it sub-optimal for cooling and can lead to overheating-related issues.

=== Technical specifications ===
Obsolete	Vintage

Model			2018			2019			2020		
Model details
Model details	Model number		A1932						A2179		
Model details	Hardware strings		MacBookAir8,1			MacBookAir8,2			MacBookAir9,1		
Model details	Part/order number (Space gray, silver, gold in order)		MRE82, MREA2, MREE2	MRE92, MREC2, MREF2	MUQT2, MUQU2, MUQV2	MVFH2, MVFK2, MVFM2	MVFJ2, MVFL2, MVFN2	MVH62, Built-to-order (Silver), MVH82	MYE52, MYE62, MYE72 (education only)	MWTJ2, MWTK2, MWTL2	MVH22, MVH42, MVH52
Model details	MSRP (US$)		$1199	$1399	$1599	$1099	$1299	$1499	$799	$999	$1299
Timeline
Timeline	Announced date		October 30, 2018			July 9, 2019			March 18, 2020		
Timeline	Released date		November 7, 2018			July 9, 2019			March 18, 2020		
Timeline	Discontinued date		July 9, 2019			March 18, 2020			November 10, 2020		
Timeline	Unsupported date		September 15, 2026						Security fixes only		
Initial release operating system			macOS 10.14 Mojave						macOS 10.15 Catalina		
Latest release operating system			macOS 14 Sonoma						macOS 15 Sequoia		
Display
Display	Screen size		13.3 in (340 mm) (diagonal)								
Display	Backlight		LED-backlit								
Display	Technology		Retina display with IPS technology								
Display	Resolution		2560 × 1600								
Display	Pixel density (ppi)		227								
Display	Aspect ratio		16:10								
Display	Supported scaled resolutions		1680 × 1050 (rendered as 3360 × 2100); 1440 × 900 (rendered as 2880 × 1800, default); 1280 × 800 (rendered as 2560 × 1600, native); 1024 × 640 (rendered as 2048 × 1280)								
Display	SDR max brightness ( cd/m^{2})		400								
Display	XDR max brightness ( cd/m^{2})		—N/a								
Display	Color depth		8-bit (native) with millions of colors								
Display	Full sRGB display		Yes								
Display	Wide color display (Display P3)		No								
Display	True Tone display		No			Yes					
Display	Night Shift		Yes								
Display	ProMotion display		No								
Display	Fixed refresh rates		60 Hz								
Cooling system			Single-fan cooling system, no heat spreader on processor								
Processor
Processor	Chip		8th-generation Intel Core i5 8210Y						10th-generation Intel Core i3 1000NG4		10th-generation Intel Core i5 1030NG7
Processor	Codename		Amber Lake						Ice Lake		
Processor	Technology node		14 nm						10 nm		
Processor	CPU										
Processor	CPU	Total cores	2								4
Processor	CPU	Total threads	4								8
Processor	CPU	Base clock speed	1.6 GHz						1.1 GHz		
Processor	CPU	Turbo clock speed	3.6 GHz						3.2 GHz		3.5 GHz
Processor	CPU	L3 cache	4 MB								6 MB
Processor	CPU	Bus speed	4 GT/s								
Processor	CPU	Online configuration	—N/a							10th-generation Intel Core i5 1030NG7 with: 4-core CPU with 8 threads; 1.1 GHz Base Clock Speed; 3.5 GHz Turbo Clock Speed; 6 MB L3 Cache, or; 10th-generation Intel Core i7 1060NG7 with: 4-core CPU with 8 threads; 1.2 GHz Base Clock Speed; 3.8 GHz Turbo Clock Speed; 8 MB L3 Cache	10th-generation Intel Core i7 1060NG7 with: 4-core CPU with 8 threads; 1.2 GHz Base Clock Speed; 3.8 GHz Turbo Clock Speed; 8 MB L3 Cache
Graphics
Graphics	Integrated										
Graphics	Integrated	Name	Intel UHD Graphics 617						Intel Iris Plus Graphics		
Graphics	Integrated	Tier	GT2						G4		G7
Graphics	Integrated	EUs and shading units	24 (192)						48 (384)		64 (512)
Graphics	Integrated	Shared memory	1536 MB								
Graphics	Integrated	eDRAM	—N/a								
Graphics	Integrated	Online configuration	—N/a							Intel Iris Plus Graphics with G7 tier (with Intel Core i5 1030NG7 or Intel Core i7 1060NG7)	—N/a
Memory
Memory	Type		LPDDR3 2133 MHz						LPDDR4X 3733 MHz		
Memory	Capacity		8 GB		16 GB	8 GB		16 GB	8 GB		
Memory	Online configuration		16 GB		—N/a	16 GB		—N/a		16 GB	
SSD
SSD	Type		PCIe 3.0-based SSD								
SSD	Capacity		128 GB	256 GB	512 GB	128 GB	256 GB	512 GB	128 GB	256 GB	512 GB
SSD	Online configuration		256 GB; 512 GB; 1.5 TB	512 GB; 1.5 TB	1.5 TB	256 GB; 512 GB; 1 TB	512 GB; 1 TB	1 TB	—N/a	512 GB; 1 TB; 2 TB	1 TB; 2 TB
Keyboard and trackpad
Keyboard and trackpad	Type		Backlit Butterfly Keyboard with butterfly mechanism and ambient light sensor						Backlit Magic Keyboard with (Scissor-switch) mechanism and ambient light sensor		
Keyboard and trackpad	Number of keys		78 (U.S.) or 79 (ISO)								
Keyboard and trackpad	Arrow keys		4 arrow keys						4 arrow keys in an inverted-T arrangement		
Keyboard and trackpad	Function keys		Yes								
Keyboard and trackpad	Touch Bar		No								
Keyboard and trackpad	Trackpad		Force Touch Trackpad								
Secure authentication
Secure authentication	Touch ID		Yes								
Secure authentication	Security chip		Apple T2								
Audio
Audio	Speakers		Stereo speakers								
Audio	Force-cancelling woofers		No								
Audio	Wide stereo sound		No						Yes		
Audio	Dolby Atmos playback		No						Yes		
Audio	Dolby Atmos with built-in speakers		No								
Audio	Spatial audio with dynamic head tracking		No								
Audio	Microphone		Three-mic array						Three-mic array with directional beamforming		
Audio	3.5 mm jack		Yes								
Audio	Audio output from HDMI		No								
Camera
Camera	Resolution		720p FaceTime HD								
Connectivity
Connectivity	Wi-Fi (802.11)		Wi-Fi 5 (802.11a/b/g/n/ac)								
Connectivity	Maximum Wi-Fi speed		0.866 Gbit/s								
Connectivity	Bluetooth		Bluetooth 4.2						Bluetooth 5.0		
Connectivity	HDMI port		No								
Connectivity	SDXC card slot		No								
Connectivity	USB-C/Thunderbolt port		Two Thunderbolt 3 USB-C port supporting charging and DisplayPort protocols among others								
Connectivity	Transmission speed		Up to 40 Gbit/s transmission speed (Thunderbolt 3); Up to 10 Gbit/s transmission speed (USB 3.1 Gen 2)								
Connectivity	eGPU support		Yes								
Connectivity	External display support										
Connectivity	External display support	Maximum display	2								
Connectivity	External display support	Max. one display combination	5K at 60 Hz at 8-bit						6K at 60 Hz at 8-bit, or; 5K at 60 Hz at 8-bit		
Connectivity	External display support	Max two displays combination	2 × 4K at 60 Hz at 8-bit								
Power
Power	Battery		11.4 V 49.9 W·h (4,379 mA·h)								
Power	Power adapter		30 W USB-C								
Power	Charging method		USB-C ports								
Dimensions
Dimensions	Height		0.16 in (0.41 cm) to 0.61 in (1.5 cm)						0.16 in (0.41 cm) to 0.63 in (1.6 cm)		
Dimensions	Width		11.97 in (30.4 cm)								
Dimensions	Depth		8.36 in (21.2 cm)								
Total greenhouse gas emissions			176 kg CO_{2}e (128 GB storage)	198 kg CO_{2}e (256 GB storage)	[data missing]	176 kg CO_{2}e (128 GB storage)	198 kg CO_{2}e (256 GB storage)	[data missing]	[data missing]	174 kg CO_{2}e (2-core CPU, 256 GB storage)	202 kg CO_{2}e (4-core CPU, 512 GB storage)

== Supported operating systems ==
=== Supported macOS releases ===
macOS Sequoia or macOS Tahoe will work with Wi-Fi and graphics acceleration on unsupported MacBook Air computers with a compatible patch utility. The 2013 through 2017 models can already run macOS Tahoe with it, but 2012 models or earlier are still not compatible at all. As of 2022, the mid 2012 and mid 2013 MacBook Air are the only models officially supported by Apple with nine versions of the Mac operating system. Official support ended with macOS Sequoia, as its successor, macOS Tahoe, only supports Apple silicon-based MacBook Airs.

Supported macOS releases
OS release	Original design			Redesign							Retina		
OS release	Early 2008	Late 2008	Mid 2009	Late 2010	Mid 2011	Mid 2012	Mid 2013	Early 2014	Early 2015	2017	2018	2019	2020
10.4 Tiger	Unofficial, no graphics acceleration	—N/a	—N/a	—N/a	—N/a	—N/a	—N/a	—N/a	—N/a	—N/a	—N/a	—N/a	—N/a
10.5 Leopard	10.5.1	10.5.5	10.5.7	—N/a	—N/a	—N/a	—N/a	—N/a	—N/a	—N/a	—N/a	—N/a	—N/a
10.6 Snow Leopard	Yes	Yes	Yes	10.6.4	Unofficial	Unofficial, no graphics acceleration	—N/a	—N/a	—N/a	—N/a	—N/a	—N/a	—N/a
10.7 Lion	Yes	Yes	Yes	Yes	Yes	10.7.4	—N/a	—N/a	—N/a	—N/a	—N/a	—N/a	—N/a
10.8 Mountain Lion	Patch	Yes	Yes	Yes	Yes	Yes	10.8.4	Unofficial	—N/a	—N/a	—N/a	—N/a	—N/a
10.9 Mavericks	Patch, no graphics acceleration	Yes	Yes	Yes	Yes	Yes	Yes	10.9.2	—N/a	—N/a	—N/a	—N/a	—N/a
10.10 Yosemite	Patch, no graphics acceleration	Yes	Yes	Yes	Yes	Yes	Yes	Yes	10.10.2	Unofficial	—N/a	—N/a	—N/a
10.11 El Capitan	Patch, no graphics acceleration	Yes	Yes	Yes	Yes	Yes	Yes	Yes	Yes	Unofficial	—N/a	—N/a	—N/a
10.12 Sierra	No	Patch		Yes	Yes	Yes	Yes	Yes	Yes	10.12.5	—N/a	—N/a	—N/a
10.13 High Sierra	No	Patch		Yes	Yes	Yes	Yes	Yes	Yes	Yes	—N/a	—N/a	—N/a
10.14 Mojave	No	Patch				Yes	Yes	Yes	Yes	Yes	10.14.1	10.14.5	—N/a
10.15 Catalina	No	Patch				Yes	Yes	Yes	Yes	Yes	Yes	Yes	10.15.4
11 Big Sur	No	Patch					Yes	Yes	Yes	Yes	Yes	Yes	Yes
12 Monterey	No	Patch							Yes	Yes	Yes	Yes	Yes
13 Ventura	No	Patch									Yes	Yes	Yes
14 Sonoma	No	Patch									Yes	Yes	Yes
15 Sequoia	No	Patch									(Note: Unsupported by Apple, no unofficial patch yet. See "macOS Sequoia | OpenCore Legacy Patcher". dortania.github.io. Archived from the original on October 9, 2024.)		Yes
26 Tahoe (Note: macOS Tahoe is the final release of macOS to support Intel-based Macs.)	No	No	No	No	No	No	Patch				No	No	No

=== Windows through Boot Camp ===
Boot Camp Assistant allows Intel Macs to dual-boot Windows.

Supported Windows versions
OS release	Original design	Redesign					Retina
OS release	Early 2008 – mid 2009	Late 2010	Mid 2011	Mid 2012	Mid 2013 – early 2014	Early 2015 and later	
Windows XP (Note: Windows XP can only be installed on Macs with Boot Camp 3 or earlier. This includes Mac OS X 10.6 or earlier and copies of OS X 10.7 that have not been updated to Boot Camp 4.)	Yes	No	No	No	No	No	No
Windows Vista 32-bit (Note: Windows Vista can only be installed on Macs with Boot Camp 3 or earlier. This includes Mac OS X 10.6 or earlier and copies of OS X 10.7 that have not been updated to Boot Camp 4.)	Yes	No	No	No	No	No	No
Windows Vista 64-bit	Not Compatible With MacBook Air						
Windows 7 32-bit (Note: The 32-bit version of Windows 7 can only be installed on Macs with Boot Camp 3.1 to 6.0. This includes OS X 10.11 and earlier.)	Yes	Yes	Yes	Yes	No	No	No
Windows 7 64-bit (Note: The 64-bit version of Windows 7 can only be installed on Macs with Boot Camp 3.1 or later, running macOS High Sierra or earlier. Later versions of macOS no longer support Windows 7.)	No	Yes	Yes	Yes	Yes	No	No
Windows 8 (Note: Windows 8 can only be installed on Macs with Boot Camp 5.0 to 6.0. This includes OS X 10.11 and earlier.) (Note: Only 64-bit versions of Windows are supported for Windows 8 and later.)	No	No	Yes	Yes	Yes	Yes	No
Windows 8.1 (Note: Windows 8.1 can only be installed on Macs with Boot Camp 5.1 or later, running macOS High Sierra or earlier. Later versions of macOS no longer support Windows 8.1.)	No	No	Yes	Yes	Yes	Yes	No
Windows 10 (Note: Windows 10 can only be installed on Macs with Boot Camp 6.0 or later. It is the only supported version of Windows on macOS Mojave and later.)	No	No	No	Yes	Yes	Yes	Yes

== Timeline ==
Timeline of portable Macintoshes
See also: List of Mac models

== See also ==
- MacBook Air (Apple silicon)
- MacBook
- 12-inch MacBook
- MacBook Pro
