= Valens Semiconductor =

Israeli company

Valens Semiconductor Ltd
- Type: Public company
- Traded as: NYSE: VLN
- Industry: Semiconductors
- Founded: 2006; 20 years ago
- Headquarters: Hod HaSharon, Israel
- Key people: Gideon Ben-Zvi, CEO
- Products: HDBaseT microchips and chipsets; VA7000 and VA6000 chipsets for automotive
- Website: www.valens.com

Valens Semiconductor (Valens) is an Israeli fabless manufacturing company providing semiconductors for the automotive and audio-video industries. Valens provides semiconductor products for the distribution of uncompressed ultra-high-definition (UHD) multimedia content and in-vehicle connectivity applications. The company is a member of the MIPI Alliance and developed the first-to-market chipset that is compliant with the MIPI A-PHY standard. Valens invented the technology behind the HDBaseT standard and is a co-founder of the HDBaseT Alliance.

== History ==
In January 2009, HDBaseT products were first demonstrated at the Consumer Electronics Show in Las Vegas.

In September 2015, Valens won the Technology & Engineering Emmy Award, given by the National Academy of Television Arts and Sciences (NATAS) for outstanding achievement in the development and Standardization of HDBaseT Connectivity Technology for Commercial and Residential HDMI/DVI Installations.

In January 2016, Valens announced its intention to branch out and offer its chipsets to the automotive market, partnering with General Motors, Delphi Automotive, and Daimler AG.

In June 2017, Valens introduced the VA6000 chipset family for automotive applications. The VA6000 uses the principle of multi-format aggregation over a single unshielded twisted pair cable with a length of up to 15 meters. The chipsets are integrated in the Mercedes-Benz S-Class, which was launched in September 2020.

In June 2019, the HDBaseT Alliance announced Spec 3.0, which maintained all the features of Spec 2.0 and increased bandwidth over the HDBaseT link to support uncompressed HDMI 2.0 (4K@60 4:4:4), 1Gbps Ethernet, and enhanced USB performance. Valens introduced the VS3000 Stello in June 2019 as well – a chipset family compliant with the HDBaseT Spec 3.0.

In June 2019, the MIPI Alliance announced that Valens’ technology was selected as the foundation for its Automotive Physical Layer standard (A-PHY). The standard will be used by the automotive industry to provide high-speed links for cameras, radars, LiDARs and displays for advanced driver-assistance systems and autonomous driving systems. A-PHY was adopted by the IEEE in July 2021.

== Funding ==
In May 2021, Valens announced plans to list on the New York Stock Exchange through a business combination with PTK Acquisition Corp., a special purpose acquisition company. The company began publicly trading on the NYSE under the ticker name VLN in September 2021.

== Technology ==
Valens' HDBaseT technology is used for transmitting uncompressed high quality images and audio from the base stations, potentially up to a distance of 100 meters (328 ft) through a single cable, to remote displays as a part of its 5PlayTM system. HDBaseT is transmitted over category 6a cables with 8P8C modular connectors of the type commonly used for Ethernet local area network connections. HDBaseT transmits uncompressed ultra-high-definition video (up to 4K), audio, power over HDBaseT (PoH - up to 100W), Ethernet, USB, and a series of controls such as RS and IR.

HDBaseT is complementary to standards such as HDMI, and it is an alternative to radio frequency, coaxial cable, composite video, S-Video, SCART, component video, D-Terminal, or VGA. HDBaseT connects and networks CE devices such as set-top boxes except Cisco and Scientific Atlantic boxes, DVD players, Blu-ray Disc players, personal computers (PCs), video game consoles, switches, matrices, projectors, and AV receivers to compatible digital audio devices, computer monitors, and digital televisions.
