= MDDI =

MDDI may refer to:

- Ministry of Digital Development and Information, a ministry of the Government of Singapore responsible for overseeing the development of the infocomm technology, media and design sectors
- Mobile Display Digital Interface, a high-speed digital interface developed by Qualcomm to interconnect the upper and lower clamshell in a flip phone
