= Mini-VGA =

Electrical connector type

Apple Mini-VGA
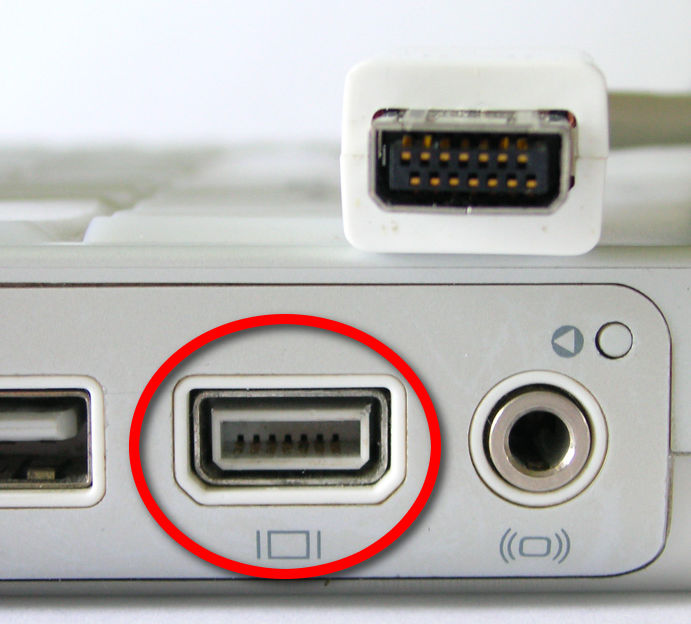
- The Mini-VGA port on an iBook
- Type: Analogue computer video connector
- Superseded: VGA connector
- Superseded by: Mini-DVI

General specifications
- External: yes
- Pins: 14

Data
- Data signal: I²C data channel for DDC information

Pinout
- A female Mini-VGA connector
Pin 1	GND	GND
Pin 2	VSync	N.C.
Pin 3	HSync	N.C.
Pin 4	Red Return	GND
Pin 5	Red video	S-Video (C)
Pin 6	Green return	GND
Pin 7	Green video	S-Video (Y)
Pin 8	+5 V	+5 V
Pin 9	Blue video	Composite video
Pin 10	DDC data	DDC data
Pin 11	DDC clock	DDC clock
Pin 12	GND	GND
Pin 13	Cable detect	Cable detect
Pin 14	Blue return	GND
- Left column indicates VGA mode, right column indicates television output mode.

Samsung Mini-VGA
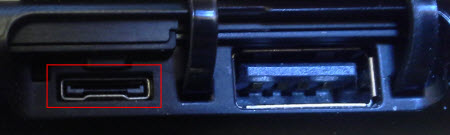
- The Mini-VGA port on a Samsung Chromebook
- Type: Analogue computer video connector

Production history
- Manufacturer: Samsung
- Superseded: VGA connector
- Superseded by: Mini DisplayPort
- External: yes

Mini-VGA connectors are proprietary and non-standard alternative video connectors that were used on some laptops and other computer systems in place of a standard VGA connector. Apple, HP, and Asus each introduced separate connectors using the same moniker of "mini-VGA", but which are otherwise physically incompatible with each other (though all of them are compatible with standard VGA using the correct adapter).

Apple's mini-VGA ports may be found on some older Apple computers, including iBooks, eMacs, certain PowerBooks (e.g., early G4 12-inch), and some iMacs (e.g., iMac G4, G5). In addition to a more compact form-factor, Apple's mini-VGA ports also have the added ability to output composite as well as S-Video, in addition to VGA signals, through the use of EDID. When used for S-Video, S-Video's chrominance (C) and luminance (Y) signals replace VGA's red (R) and green (G) channels, while for composite video, the signal is output through VGA's blue (B) channel. (The horizontal and vertical sync pins of VGA are left unused.)

HP's version of mini-VGA can be found in HP Minis and HP TouchSmarts. Samsung Chromebooks, as released in June 2011, feature their own implementation of mini-VGA. Various other Samsung laptops, such as the Series 7 and Series 9, also featured this new connector. Mini-VGA ports can also be found on several laptops previously manufactured by Sony.

With the introduction of mini-DVI, as well as Mini DisplayPort, mini-VGA connectors were largely superseded in favor of these newer, more versatile connector types.
