= Mobile Display Digital Interface =

Mobile Display Digital Interface (MDDI) is a high-speed digital interface developed by Qualcomm to interconnect the upper and lower clamshell in a flip phone. The MDDI solution supports variable data rates of up to 3.2 Gbit/s, and decreases the number of signals that connect the digital baseband controller with the LCD and camera.

The integration of MDDI is said to enable the adoption of advanced features, such as high-definition (QVGA) LCDs and high-resolution megapixel cameras for wireless devices, and supports capabilities such as driving an external display or a video projector from a handset.

A Video Electronics Standards Association (VESA) approved standard, the MDDI solution is currently available and integrated into select Qualcomm chipsets.

== See also ==
- List of display interfaces
- DBI from MIPI
- DSI from MIPI
