= HDBaseT =

Point-to-point media connection over category cable

- Type: AV signal extension technology

Production history
- Designer: HDBaseT Alliance
- Designed: June 2010

General specifications
- Length: 100 metres (330 ft), including the support of multi hops (8 × 100 m)
- Hot pluggable: Yes
- Daisy chain: Yes
- Audio signal: Yes, up to 32 channels 24-bit 192 kHz PCM embedded in HDMI, or separate bi-directional S/PDIF
- Video signal: Supports video and PC video formats including standard, enhanced, high-definition, ultra high-definition (4K), high dynamic range (HDR), and 3D video.
- Cable: Cat 5e, Cat 6, or Cat 6A
- Connector: 8P8C

Electrical
- Signal: DC power up to 100 W

Data
- Data signal: Yes, also with Fast Ethernet (100 Mbit/s) or Gigabit Ethernet
- Bitrate: Up to 16 Gbit/s down, 2 GBit/s up

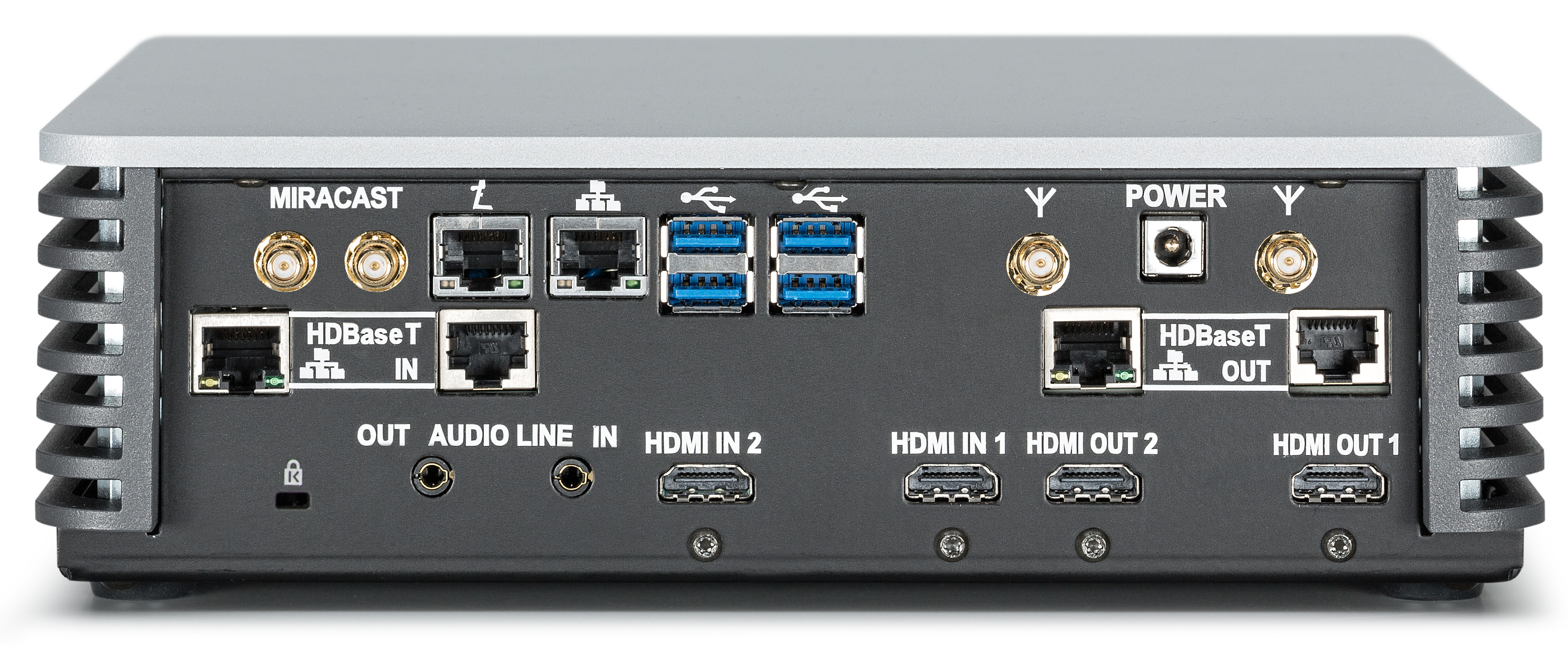
HDBaseT connectors at a presentation and collaboration system from WolfVision

HDBaseT is a consumer electronic (CE) and commercial connectivity standard for transmission of uncompressed ultra-high-definition video, digital audio, DC power, Ethernet, USB 2.0, and other control communication (such as RS-232 and Consumer IR) over a single category cable (Cat 5e or better) up to 100 m (328 ft) in length, terminated using 8P8C modular connectors. The conductors, cable, and connectors are as used in Ethernet networks, but are not otherwise exchangeable. HDBaseT technology is promoted and advanced by the HDBaseT Alliance.

== History ==
The HDBaseT Alliance was incorporated on June 14, 2010 by Samsung Electronics, Sony Pictures Entertainment, LG Electronics and Valens Semiconductor as the not-for-profit organization to promote the HDBaseT standard originally created by Valens. The HDBaseT 1.0 specification was also finalized in June 2010. HDBaseT initially dominated in extender products for HDMI technology before later also being embedded in AV devices such as video projectors and AV receivers. Products utilizing HDBaseT technology were first demonstrated by multiple vendors at the Consumer Electronics Show as early as 2010, and by the HDBaseT Alliance in 2013.

In 2013, the HDBaseT Alliance issued Specification 2.0 to enrich the HDBaseT offering to the pro-AV market and enable a multimedia home connectivity solution. Spec 2.0 maintains all the features of Spec 1.0, but also adds HDBaseT networking, switching, and control-point capabilities such as flexible and fully utilized mesh topology, distributed routing, and end-to-end error handling, enabling multipoint-to-multipoint connectivity and multi-streaming. Spec 2.0 also embeds USB 2.0 signals, enabling the zero-latency distribution of signals such as for touch-screen functionality and keyboard-video-mouse (KVM). HDBaseT 2.0 maintained category cable as the transmission medium, but also added the option for optical fiber for even greater distances and infrastructure cabling adaptability.

In 2014, the IEEE Standards Association announced that it formed a series of P1911 Working groups with the intention of adopting HDBaseT as a new standard. This project ended up being abandoned with it being administratively withdrawn by 2018.

An Internet Protocol (IP) version of HDBaseT was demonstrated in 2017.

The HDBaseT Alliance released specification 3.0 in 2019, doubling the main downstream signal bandwidth to enable support for uncompressed 4K/60 4:4:4 video, and 6.5× the bandwidth on the auxiliary channel. This enables a significant increase to USB 2.0 data rate capabilities, and advancement of Ethernet support from Fast Ethernet to Gigabit Ethernet.

== Features ==
HDBaseT is complementary to digital connectivity standards such as HDMI technology. HDBaseT connects and networks commercial, industrial or CE devices such as set-top boxes, media streamers, DVD players, Blu-ray Disc players, personal computers (PCs), video game consoles, and AV receivers to compatible digital audio devices, computer monitors, multi-touch displays, digital televisions, and digital video projectors.

A primary differentiator with HDBaseT technology is its 5Play feature set. The five features of 5Play vary with each HDBaseT specification, but center around audiovisual (AV) media, Ethernet, USB, Control Signals, and Power-over-HDBaseT (PoH).

=== AV ===
==== DVI/HDMI format AV ====
Supports uncompressed video to a network of devices or as a point-to-point connection to accurately render gaming graphics and features such as electronic program guides, and does not degrade video quality. Supports TV and PC video formats, including standard, enhanced, high-definition, Ultra-HD (UHD, up to 4K), and 3D video.

HDBaseT 1.0 and 2.0 can support uncompressed video up to (750 MB/s):

- 4K at 30 Hz with 8-bit 4:4:4 color coding,
- 4K at 30 Hz with up to 12-bit 4:2:2 and high dynamic range (HDR),
- 4K at 30 Hz with Dolby Vision standard mode,
- 4K at 60 Hz with 8-bit 4:2:0 color coding.

HDBaseT 3.0 can support uncompressed video up to (1500 MByte/s):

- 4K at 60 Hz with 8-bit 4:4:4 color coding,
- 4K at 60 Hz with up to 12-bit 4:2:2 and high dynamic range (HDR),
- 4K at 60 Hz with Dolby Vision standard mode.

Audio is embedded with the video in HDMI, so all standard HDMI audio formats are supported. This includes up to 32 channels of high-resolution 24-bit 192 kHz audio, either compressed or uncompressed, or 2-channel audio with a sampling frequency up to 1536 kHz.

==== Bidirectional S/PDIF ====
HDBaseT 2.0 introduced additional support for separate bi-directional S/PDIF audio, the upstream channel of which can optionally be used to carry HDMI Audio Return Channel, a feature introduced with the HDMI 1.4 specification. The bandwidth increase with HDBaseT 3.0 enables it to optionally support HDMI enhanced Audio Return Channel (eARC), for all of the same audio formats upstream as what is already available in the main HDMI downstream signal, including immersive/object-based audio such as Dolby Atmos or DTS:X.

=== Near zero latency ===
The specification allows for negligible latency: less than 100 μs over 100 m of cable. As a point of comparison, a 60 Hz refresh rate means a full image is displayed after 16.67 ms. Adding 0.1 ms is only a 0.6% increase in the signal latency.

=== Ethernet ===
HDBaseT 1.0 and 2.0 supports the 100 Mbit/s version of Ethernet, implemented as part of HDBaseT auxiliary datastream, independent from conventional Ethernet over twisted pair. This can provide Internet access to devices such as smart TVs, or enable computers and other CE devices to communicate with each other and access multimedia content on the local network. HDBaseT 3.0 increases this capability to 1000 Base-T (Gigabit) Ethernet.

=== USB ===
HDBaseT 2.0 introduced support for USB 2.0, with a capacity for the simultaneous connection of up to 7 USB devices and a transfer rate up to 190 Mbit/s. HDBaseT 3.0 increases this to 350 Mbit/s.

=== Control signals ===
HDBaseT delivers HDMI Consumer Electronics Control (CEC) protocol signals that control basic functionality such as power-on, power-off and play/stop, along with RS-232 and consumer IR (remote control) commands.

=== Power ===
HDBaseT can provide a variation of Power-over-Ethernet (PoE) standard called power-over-HDBaseT (PoH). This can provision up to 100 W of operating DC power to CE devices, such as monitors and TVs. In practice, if a display (typically up to 60" in size) is enabled as a 100W powered device (PD), and is connected to a matching PoH transmitter (power sourcing equipment, PSE), the display will be able to draw its operating power through the HDBaseT link and not require a separate power connection.

== Versions ==
=== Specification 1.0 ===
HDBaseT 1.0 utilizes 16-level pulse-amplitude modulation (PAM-16) encoding for downstream data at a rate of 500 Msymbols/s, achieving an aggregate data rate of 8000 Mbit/s on 4 lanes. This is equivalent to the 8160 Mbit/s of HDMI 1.3/1.4. The HDBaseT auxiliary data operates with PAM-8 encoding at a rate of 12.5 Msymbols/s for an aggregate 150 Mbit/s.

All packets are sent over all four lanes. Time-division multiplexing is used to divide the cable among all possible uses: downstream (AV) data, downstream auxiliary, upstream auxiliary, various training and alignment.

The 5Play feature set of HDBaseT 1.0 delivers video, audio, Ethernet, control signals, and power over a single connection. It does not support USB.

The minimum compatible cable type is Cat 5e, although Cat 6 is recommended. Termination is 8P8C modular connectors. Length potential is 100 metres (330 ft) at 1080p, and 70 metres (230 ft) at UHD 4K.

=== Specification 2.0 ===
HDBaseT 2.0 maintains PAM16 encoding and an aggregate data rate of 8 Gbit/s. However, the auxiliary channel rate was doubled to 25 Msymbols/s for an aggregate 300 Mbit/s. The increased rate predominantly supports USB 2.0 and separate S/PDIF audio. Additionally, version 2.0 specifies the HDBaseT network protocol, defining the required adaptations across all layers of the OSI model, to provide the optimized services for time-sensitive applications such as high throughput video and audio.

Cabling recommendations for HDBaseT 2.0 remained the same, but the enhanced digital signal processing (DSP) and automatic repeat request (ARQ) for retransmission capabilities increase the reliability and performance to achieve up to 100 metres (330 ft) at 1080p and 90 metres (300 ft) at UHD 4K video resolutions. This can be increased to 100 m for UHD 4K by using Cat 6A cable or better.

=== Specification 3.0 ===
HDBaseT 3.0 also maintains PAM16 encoding, but doubles the rate to 1000 Msymbols/s for an aggregate data rate of 16 Gbit/s. This is equivalent to 18 Gbit/s in HDMI transmission: the ceiling of the HDMI 2.0 specification. Furthermore, the auxiliary channel is also upgraded to PAM16 (from PAM8), and rate increased to 125 Msymbols/s for an aggregate 2 Gbit/s. This extra upstream data rate capability enables Gigabit Ethernet support, and increases USB 2.0 speed to 350 Mbit/s.

The 5Play feature set of HDBaseT 3.0 is carried over from HDBaseT 2.0, albeit with enhanced capabilities.

Cabling for HDBaseT 3.0 requires the use of Cat 6A or better, terminated with 8P8C connectors.

== See also ==
- Audio Video Bridging – Specifications for synchronized, low-latency streaming
- Digital Interface for Video and Audio (DiiVA) – Bi-directional audio/video at 13.5 Gbit/s over Cat6A
- DisplayPort – Audio/video interface at 17.28 Gbit/s
- Software Defined Video over Ethernet (SDVoE) Alliance
- Universal Power Adapter for Mobile Devices (UPAMD) – Power supply standards for 10–130 W (optionally 240 W)
