= Mini-DVI =

Digital alternative to the Mini-VGA connector by Apple

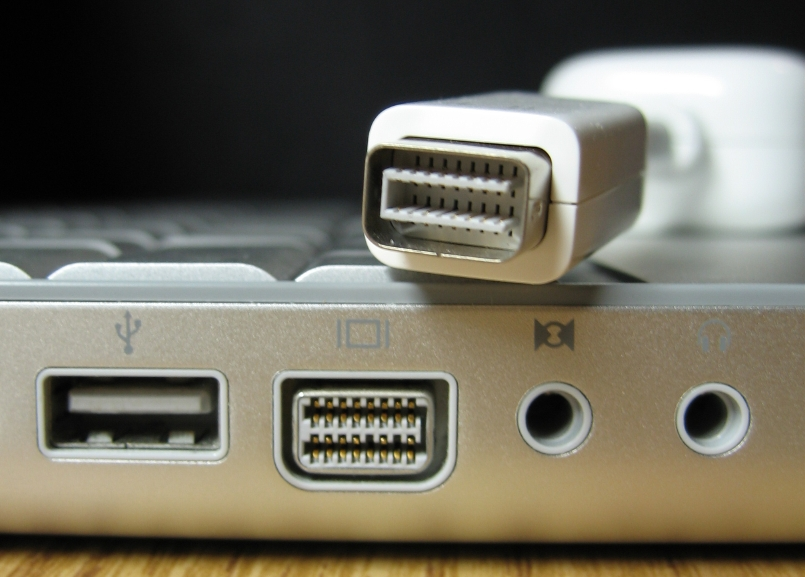
- The Mini-DVI plug on a 12-inch PowerBook G4
- Type: Digital and analog computer video connector

Production history
- Designer: Apple Inc.
- Manufacturer: Apple Inc.
- Superseded: Mini-VGA
- Superseded by: Mini DisplayPort (October 2008)

General specifications
- External: yes
- Video signal: As DVI
- Pins: 32

Pinout
- A female mini-DVI socket
Pin 1	Dat2_P	Data 2 +
Pin 2	Dat2_N	Data 2 -
Pin 3	Dat1_P	Data 1 +
Pin 4	Dat1_N	Data 1 -
Pin 5	Dat0_P	Data 0 +
Pin 6	Dat0_N	Data 0 -
Pin 7	CLK_P	Clock +
Pin 8	CLK_N	Clock -
Pin 9	DGND	Ground
Pin 10	DGND	Ground
Pin 11	DGND	Ground
Pin 12	DGND	Ground
Pin 13	DGND	Ground
Pin 14	DGND	Ground
Pin 15	DGND	Ground
Pin 16	DGND	Ground
Pin 17	+5 V	
Pin 18	DDC_DAT	DDC data
Pin 19	spare	
Pin 20	BLUE	Analog blue (Alternate function composite video)
Pin 21	not installed	
Pin 22	GREEN	Analog green (Alternate function luma in s-video)
Pin 23	not installed	
Pin 24	RED	Analog red (Alternate function chroma in s-video)
Pin 25	Detect	
Pin 26	DDC_CLK	DDC clock
Pin 27	spare	
Pin 28	DGND	Ground
Pin 29	HSYNC	Horizontal sync
Pin 30	DGND	Ground
Pin 31	VSYNC	Vertical sync
Pin 32	DGND	Ground

The Mini-DVI connector was used on certain older Apple computers as a digital alternative to Apple's Mini-VGA connector. Its size is between the full-sized DVI and the tiny Micro-DVI. It is found on the 12-inch PowerBook G4 (except the original 12-inch 867 MHz PowerBook G4, which used Mini-VGA), the Intel-based iMac, the MacBook Intel-based laptop, the Intel-based Xserve, and the 2009 Mac mini.

In October 2008, Apple announced the company was phasing Mini-DVI out in favor of Mini DisplayPort.

Mini-DVI connectors on Apple hardware are capable of carrying DVI, VGA, or TV signals through the use of adapters, detected with EDID (Extended display identification data) via DDC. This connector is often used in place of a DVI connector in order to save physical space on devices. Mini-DVI does not support dual-link connections and hence cannot support resolutions higher than 1920×1200 @60 Hz but can support higher resolutions at 30 Hz such as 3440x1440 (21:9 UWQHD) that were not supported by the first implementation of Mini DisplayPort 1.1a.

There are various types of Mini-DVI adapter:

- Apple Mini-DVI to VGA Adapter Apple part number M9320G/A (discontinued)
- Apple Mini-DVI to Video Adapter Apple part number M9319G/A, provided both S-Video and Composite video connectors (discontinued)
- Apple Mini-DVI to DVI Adapter (DVI-D) Apple part number M9321G/B (discontinued)

Non-OEM Mini-DVI to HDMI adapters and cables are also available at online stores such as eBay and Amazon, and from some retail stores, but were not sold by Apple.

The physical connector is similar to Mini-VGA, but is differentiated by having four rows of pins arranged in two vertically stacked slots rather than the two rows of pins in the Mini-VGA.

Connecting to a DVI-I connector requires a Mini-DVI to DVI-D cable plus a DVI-D to DVI-I adapter.

== Criticisms ==
- Apple's Mini-DVI to DVI-D cable does not carry the analog signal coming from the mini-DVI port on the Apple computer. This means that it is not possible to use this cable with an inexpensive DVI-to-VGA adapter for VGA output; Apple's mini-DVI to VGA cable must be used instead. This could be avoided if Apple provided a mini-DVI to DVI-I cable. The purpose of DVI-I is to ensure universal compatibility.
- The Apple mini-DVI to DVI-D cable's package shows a DVI-I figure instead of DVI-D and does not specify that it comes with only DVI-D.

== Compatibility ==
As Mini-DVI is pin-compatible with DVI, it supports both DVI and VGA through adapters.

== See also ==
- DVI
- Micro-DVI
- Mini DisplayPort
