= D15 =

D15 may refer to:

- Allis-Chalmers D15, an American tractor
- DA-15, an electrical connector
- Dewoitine D.15, a French fighter aircraft
- Dublin 15, a postal district in Ireland
- Greek destroyer Vasilissa Olga (D15), a G- and H-class destroyer of the Royal Hellenic Navy
- HMS Vindex (D15), a Nairana-class escort carrier of the Royal Navy
- LNER Class D15, a British steam locomotive class
- LSWR D15 class, a British steam locomotive class
- Pennsylvania Railroad class D15, an American steam locomotive
- Slav Defense, a chess opening
