= ROCS Han Yang =

ROCS Han Yang (DD-15) may refer to one of the following destroyers of the Republic of China Navy:

- ROCS Han Yang (DD-15) (Benson class), the former American Benson-class destroyer USS Hilary P. Jones (DD-427) launched in December 1939; acquired by the Republic of China Navy in February 1954; struck in 1975 and scrapped
- ROCS Han Yang (DD-15) (Gearing class), the former American Gearing-class destroyer USS Herbert J. Thomas (DD-833) launched in March 1945; acquired by the Republic of China Navy in June 1974; later reclassified as DD-978; decommissioned in 1999 and sunk as artificial reef
