= Digital Interface for Video and Audio =

Bi-directional audio/video over Cat6A

DiiVA
- Type: Digital audio/video connector
- Audio signal: Yes
- Video signal: Yes

Data
- Bitrate: 13.5 Gbit/s

The Digital Interface for Video and Audio (DIVA or DiiVA) was a proposal for a bi-directional audio/video interface for transmitting both compressed and uncompressed digital streams. It was developed by Synerchip Company, Limited, based in Guangzhou and Sunnyvale, California.

DIVA supports a downstream data rate (from source to display) of 13.5 Gbit/s which is capable of deep color at resolutions higher than 1080p. DIVA also supports a 2.25 Gbit/s bi-directional communication data channel that can carry multiple sub-channels (audio, control, compressed video, etc.). This gives DIVA a raw bi-directional data rate of 18 Gbit/s or a usable bi-directional data rate of 14.4 Gbit/s (because of 8b/10b encoding). DIVA was demonstrated at the China Digital Living Forum & Showcase 2008 using a single Category 6A cable. The DIVA Promoters Group was formed by Changhong, Haier, Hisense, Konka, Panda, Skyworth, SVA, TCL Corporation and Synerchip. In February 2008, the DIVA Promoters Group hoped to finish the specs for DIVA by the end of 2008 and have DIVA chips released in 2009 or 2010.

== See also ==
- Digital Visual Interface
- DisplayPort
- HDMI
- List of video connectors
