= Micro-DVI =

Proprietary video output port

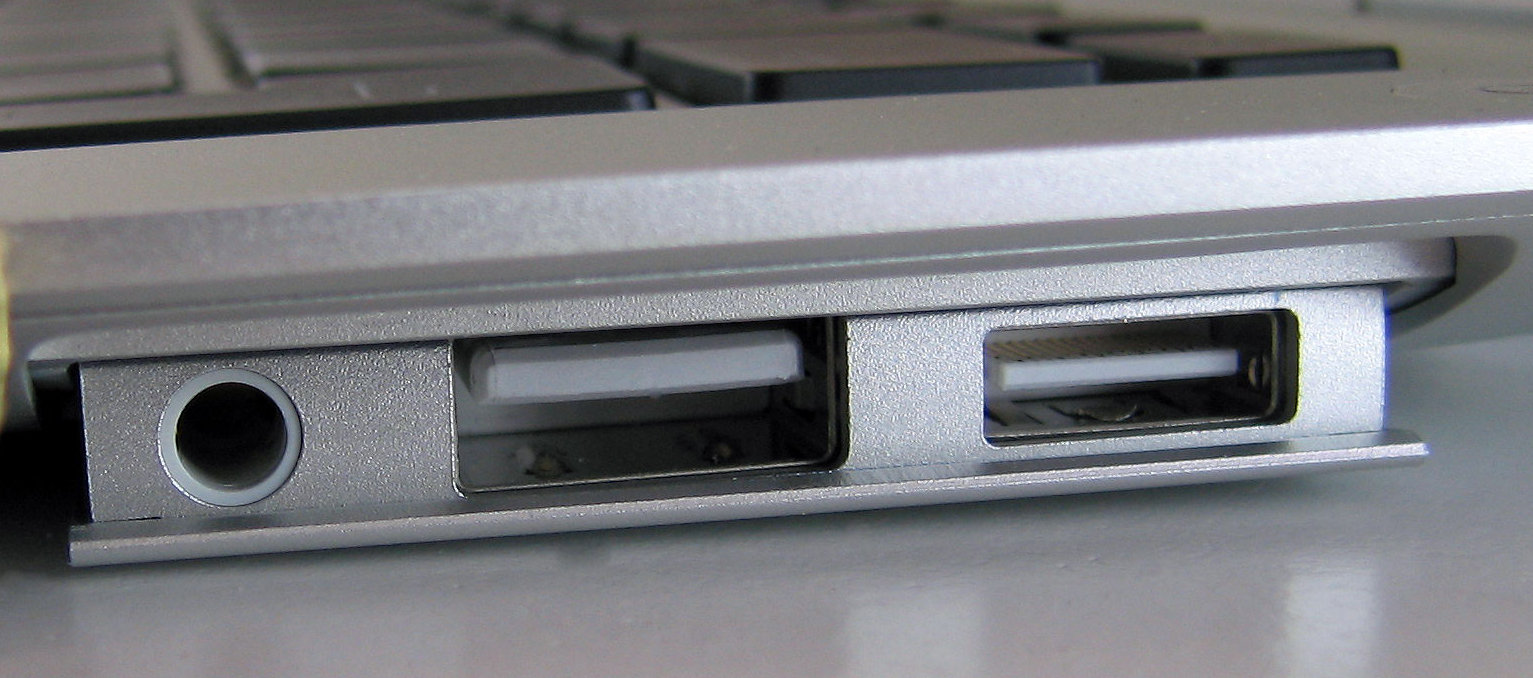
- From left to right: Headphone, USB and Micro-DVI ports on a MacBook Air
- Type: Digital video connector

Production history
- Designer: Apple Inc.
- Superseded by: Mini DisplayPort

General specifications
- Pins: 34

Pinout
- Pin 1: +5V
- Pin 2: Ground
- Pin 3: Data 2+
- Pin 4: Data 2-
- Pin 5: Ground
- Pin 6: Data 1+
- Pin 7: Data 1-
- Pin 8: Ground
- Pin 9: Clock+
- Pin 10: Clock-
- Pin 11: Ground
- Pin 12: Data 0+
- Pin 13: Data 0-
- Pin 14: Ground
- Pin 15: DDC clock
- Pin 16: DDC data
- Pin 17: Reserved
- Pin 18: Detect
- Pin 19: Ground
- Pin 20: NC
- Pin 21: Analog red
- Pin 22: NC
- Pin 23: Ground
- Pin 24: NC
- Pin 25: Analog green
- Pin 26: NC
- Pin 27: Ground
- Pin 28: NC
- Pin 29: Analog blue
- Pin 30: NC
- Pin 31: Ground
- Pin 32: Analog horizontal sync
- Pin 33: Analog vertical sync
- Pin 34: Reserved
- Pins 1-17, ordered from left to right, are on the top side of the female connector. Pins 18-34, ordered from left to right, are on the bottom side.

The Micro-DVI port is a proprietary video output port introduced on the original MacBook Air in 2008. It is smaller than the Mini-DVI port used by other contemporaneous Mac models.

To use the port for displaying video on a standard monitor or television, an adapter must be used. Both a Micro-DVI to DVI adapter and a Micro-DVI to VGA adapter were bundled with the original MacBook Air. A Micro-DVI to Video adapter, which provided composite and S-video outputs, was also sold separately. The Micro-DVI to DVI adapter is only compatible with a DVI-D (digital) signal; DVI-A and DVI-I signals do not work as they do not have the required analog connections.

The Micro-DVI connector was replaced with the Mini DisplayPort connector starting with the Late 2008 MacBook Air, making it one of the shortest lived connectors created by Apple.

Additionally, the Asus U2E subnotebook includes a "Micro-DVI" port, which unlike the Apple version has the same form factor as HDMI.

Although it is electrically compatible with HDMI, it does not provide audio output.

== See also ==
- List of video connectors
