= DE15 =

DE.15, DE-15, DE 15, DE15 or variant, may refer to:

- DE-15, a D-subminiature connector type
  - VGA connector, the common application of the DE-15 connector
- DE.15, a Nickel–Strunz classification
- USS Austin (DE-15)
- Delaware Route 15
- DE 15, one of the postcodes for Burton upon Trent
- DE15, an OECD region, see List of OECD regions by GDP (PPP) per capita
- JNR Class DE15, a Japanese diesel locomotive type

== See also ==
- DD-15 (disambiguation)
