= Pennsylvania Railroad class D15 =

PRR D15
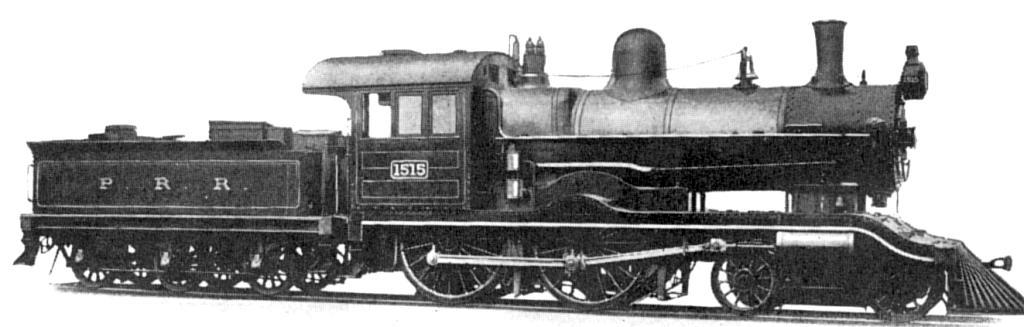
- PRR #1515 in its official builders' portrait.
Type and origin
- Power type: Steam
- Builder: PRR Altoona Shops
- Build date: 1892
- Total produced: 1
Specifications
- Configuration
  - Whyte: 4-4-0
  - UIC: 2′B nv2
- Gauge: 4 ft 8 1/2 in (1,435 mm)
- Leading dia.: 42 in (1,067 mm)
- Driver dia.: 84 in (2,134 mm)
- Wheelbase: Coupled: 8 ft 0 in (2.44 m), Loco: 27 ft 9 1/4 in (8.46 m), Loco & tender: 48 ft 1 in (14.66 m)
- Length: 59 ft 7.8 in (18,181 mm)
- Height: 14 ft 11.5 in (4,559 mm)
- Axle load: 48,500 lb (22.0 tonnes)
- Adhesive weight: 84,000 lb (38.1 tonnes)
- Loco weight: 145,500 lb (66.0 tonnes)
- Total weight: 222,500 lb (100.9 tonnes)
- Fuel type: Soft coal
- Fuel capacity: 15,000 lb (6.8 tonnes)
- Water cap.: 3,000 US gal (11,000 L; 2,500 imp gal)
- Firebox
  - Grate area: 30 sq ft (2.8 m^{2})
- Boiler pressure: 205 lbf/in^{2} (1.41 MPa)
- Heating surface
  - Firebox: 163 sq ft (15.1 m^{2})
  - Tubes: 1,662 sq ft (154.4 m^{2})
  - Total surface: 1,825 sq ft (169.5 m^{2})
- Cylinders: 2 (Lindner compound)
- High-pressure cylinder: 19.5 in × 28 in (495 mm × 711 mm)
- Low-pressure cylinder: 31 in × 28 in (787 mm × 711 mm)
- Valve gear: Stephenson
Performance figures
- Tractive effort: 20,800 lbf (92.52 kN)
- Factor of adh.: 4.04
Career
- Operators: Pennsylvania Railroad
- Class: D15
- Number in class: 1
- Numbers: 1515
- Retired: 1905

The class D15 (class T, pre 1895) of the Pennsylvania Railroad comprised a solitary Lindner-system cross compound steam locomotive of 4-4-0 "American" wheel arrangement in the Whyte notation. The sole locomotive was #1515, built in 1892 at the PRR's Altoona Shops. It was British in appearance with a full-length footplate, splashers, a six-wheel tender, and large 84 in (2,134 mm) drivers. It was built in 1892 by the PRR's Altoona Works, and remained in service until it was retired and scrapped in November 1905.
