= Mini DisplayPort =

Miniaturized version of the DisplayPort connector

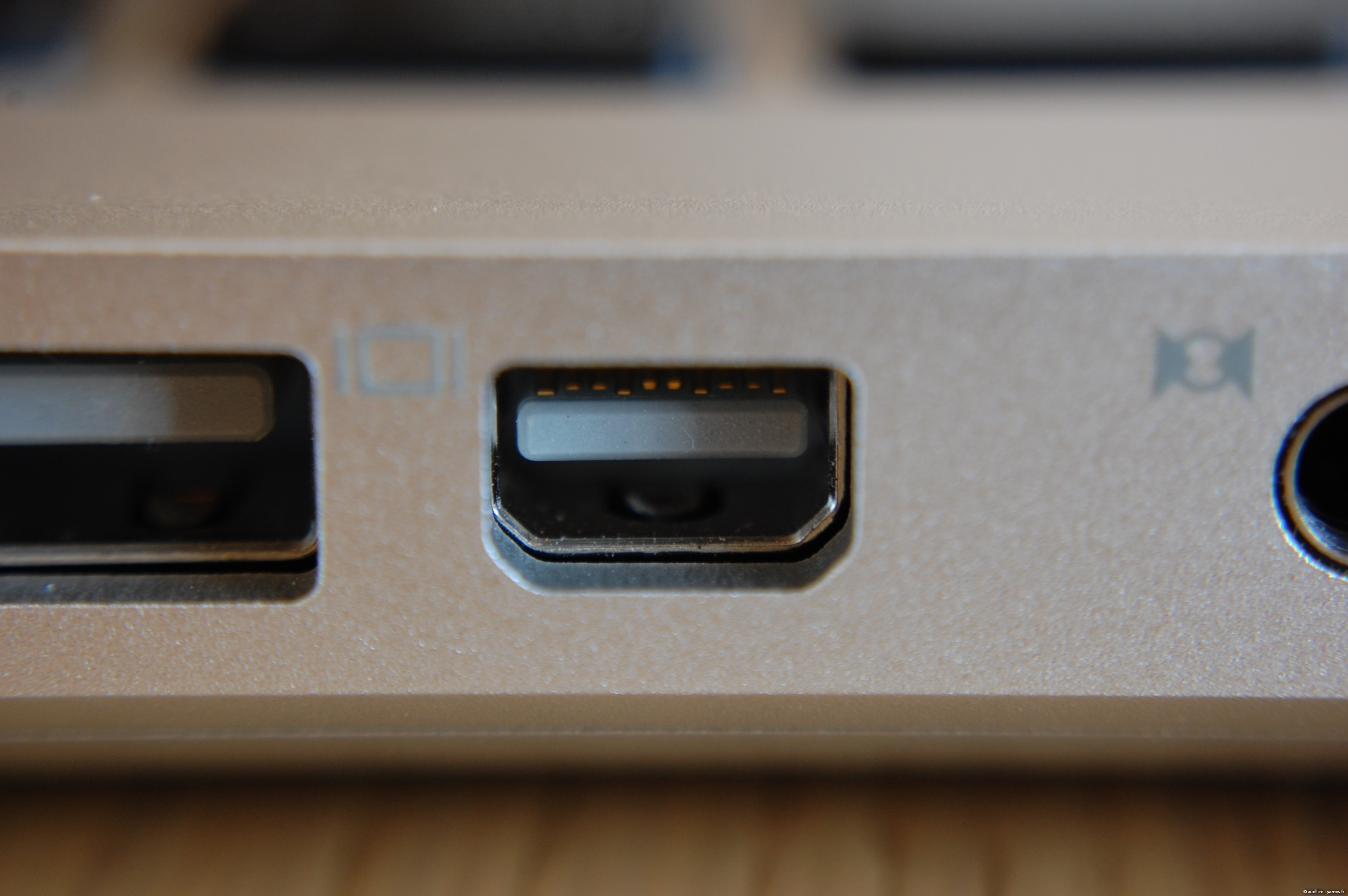
- Mini DisplayPort on a MacBook Pro
- Type: Digital and analog (via DAC) computer video connector

Production history
- Designer: Apple Inc.
- Designed: October 2008
- Manufacturer: Apple Inc.
- Produced: 2008–present
- Superseded: Micro-DVI, Mini-DVI, DVI
- Superseded by: USB-C

General specifications
- Width: 7.4 mm male (8.3 mm female)
- Height: 4.5 mm male (5.4 mm female)
- Hot pluggable: Yes
- External: Yes
- Video signal: Same as DisplayPort
- Pins: 20

Pinout
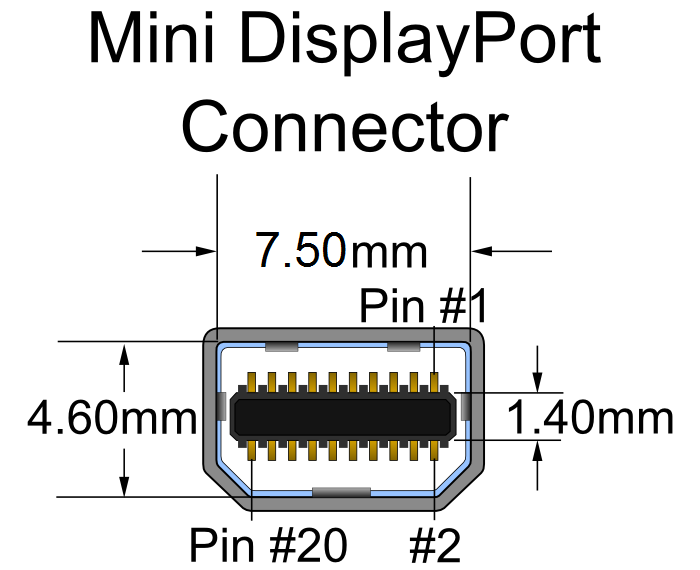
- External Mini DisplayPort Connector
Pin 1	GND	Ground
Pin 2	Hot Plug Detect	Hot Plug Detect
Pin 3	ML_Lane 0 (p)	Lane 0 (positive)
Pin 4	CONFIG1	CONFIG1
Pin 5	ML_Lane 0 (n)	Lane 0 (negative)
Pin 6	CONFIG2	CONFIG2
Pin 7	GND	Ground
Pin 8	GND	Ground
Pin 9	ML_Lane 1 (p)	Lane 1 (positive)
Pin 10	ML_Lane 3 (p)	Lane 3 (positive)
Pin 11	ML_Lane 1 (n)	Lane 1 (negative)
Pin 12	ML_Lane 3 (n)	Lane 3 (negative)
Pin 13	GND	Ground
Pin 14	GND	Ground
Pin 15	ML_Lane 2 (p)	Lane 2 (positive)
Pin 16	AUX_CH (p)	Auxiliary Channel (positive)
Pin 17	ML_Lane 2 (n)	Lane 2 (negative)
Pin 18	AUX_CH (n)	Auxiliary Channel (negative)
Pin 19	GND	Ground
Pin 20	DP_PWR	Power for connector
- This is the pinout for the source-side connector; the sink-side connector pinout will have lanes 0–3 reversed in order, i.e. lane 3 will be on pin 3(n) and 5(p) while lane 0 will be on pin 10(n) and 12(p).

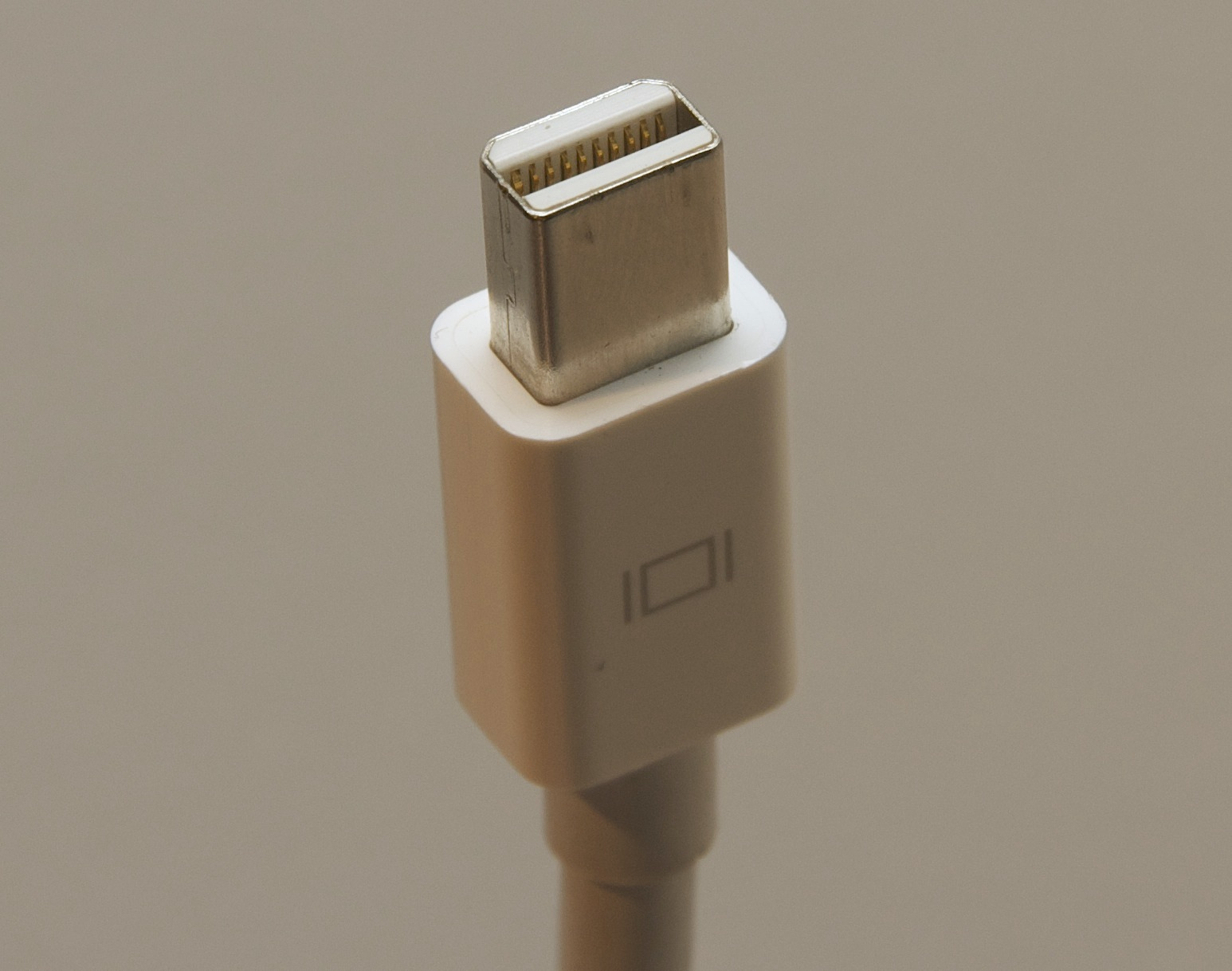
Mini DisplayPort connector

The Mini DisplayPort (MiniDP or mDP) is a miniaturized version of the DisplayPort audio-visual digital interface.

It was announced by Apple in October 2008, and by early 2013 all new Apple Macintosh computers had Mini DisplayPort, as did the LED Cinema Display. However, in 2016 Apple began phasing out the port and replacing it with the new USB-C connector. The Mini DisplayPort is also fitted to some PC motherboards, video cards, and some PC notebooks from Asus, Microsoft, MSI, Lenovo, Toshiba, HP, Dell, and other manufacturers.

Apple offers a no-fee license for the Mini DisplayPort but the license automatically terminates should the licensee "commence an action for patent infringement against Apple".

== Specifications ==
Unlike its Mini-DVI and Micro-DVI predecessors, the Mini DisplayPort can drive display devices with resolutions up to 2560 × 1600 (WQXGA) in its DisplayPort 1.1a implementation, and 4096 × 2160 (4K) in its DisplayPort 1.2 implementation. With an adapter, the Mini DisplayPort can drive display devices with VGA, DVI, or HDMI interfaces.

== Compatibility ==
Apple replaced the DVI port from the MacBook, MacBook Air, MacBook Pro, iMac, Mac Mini, and the Mac Pro with the Mini DisplayPort. Its use as the video connector for the 24-inch Cinema Display may complicate compatibility:

- Mini DisplayPort's HDCP extension disables playback of certain DRM-encrypted content on any display not designed for it. This includes some content from the iTunes Store which has no such restrictions if played on a Mac without Mini DisplayPort.
- Apple's Dual-Link DVI or VGA adapters are relatively large and expensive compared to past adapters, and customers have reported problems with them, such as being unable to connect to an external display. Monitors connected to a Mini DisplayPort via these adaptors may have resolution problems or not "wake up" from sleep.
- While the DisplayPort specification can support digital audio, the older 2009 line of MacBooks, MacBook Pros, and Mac Minis cannot provide an audio signal through the Mini DisplayPort, and only do so over USB, Firewire, or the audio line out port. (The April 2010 line of MacBook Pro, Mid 2010 MacBook, and July 2010 iMac and later do support this). This can be a problem for users who want to connect their computers to HDTVs using a Mini DisplayPort to HDMI adapter. To work around this issue, some third-party manufacturers have created dual or triple-headed adapters that get power for the adapter from a USB port, video from the Mini DisplayPort, and audio from either the USB port or the optical-out port. Either option terminates with a single female HDMI connector, thus allowing both video and audio to be channeled over the single HDMI cable.

=== Adoption ===
- In early 2009, VESA announced that Mini DisplayPort would be included in the upcoming DisplayPort 1.2 specification.
- In the fourth quarter of 2009, VESA announced that the Mini DisplayPort had been adopted. All devices using the Mini DisplayPort must comply with the 1.1a standard.
- AMD released a special variant of its Radeon HD 5870 graphics card called the Radeon HD 5870 Eyefinity 6 Edition, which features 2GB GDDR5 memory, higher clock speeds than the original card, and six Mini DisplayPort outputs with a maximum resolution of 5760 × 2160 pixels (a 3 × 2 grid of 1080p displays).
- On 13 April 2010, Apple added support for audio out using Mini DisplayPort in their MacBook Pro product line. This allows users to easily connect their MacBook Pros to their HDTVs using a cable that adapts Mini DisplayPort to HDMI with full audio and video functionality.
- On 24 February 2011, Apple and Intel announced Thunderbolt, a successor to Mini DisplayPort which adds support for PCI Express data connections while maintaining backwards compatibility with Mini DisplayPort-based peripherals.

== See also ==
- List of video connectors
- Thunderbolt – The Thunderbolt and Thunderbolt 2 interfaces used the Mini DisplayPort connector. (Thunderbolt 3, Thunderbolt 4, and Thunderbolt 5 use the USB-C, or USB Type-C, connector.)
