= S-Video =

Signal format for standard-definition video

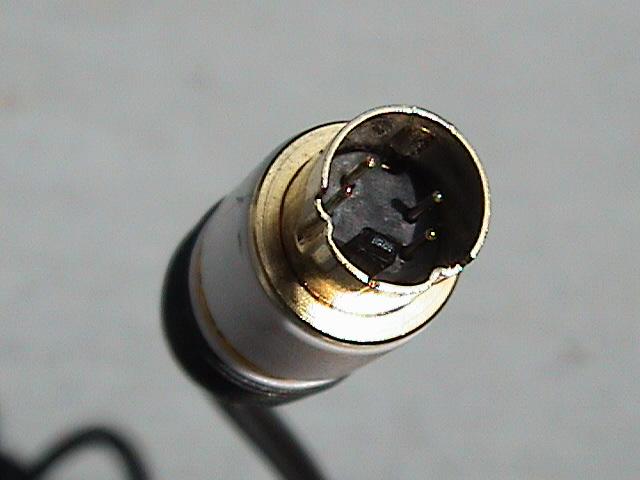
- A standard 4-pin S-Video male connector on a cable
- Type: Analog video connector

Production history
- Designed: 1987

General specifications
- Hot pluggable: Yes
- External: Yes
- Video signal: NTSC, PAL, or SECAM video
- Pins: 4, 7, or 9
- Connector: Mini-DIN connector

Pinout
- Looking at the female connector.
Pin 1	GND	Ground (Y)
Pin 2	GND	Ground (C)
Pin 3	Y	Intensity (Luminance)
Pin 4	C	Color (Chrominance)
- The shells should be connected together by an overall screen/shield. However, the shield is often absent in low-end cables, which can result in picture degradation. Same connector as Apple Desktop Bus.

S-Video (also known as separate video, Y/C, and super video) is an analog video signal format that carries standard-definition video, typically at 525 or 625-line resolution. It encodes video luma and chrominance on two separate channels, achieving higher image quality than composite video, which encodes all video information on one channel. It also eliminates several types of visual defects, such as dot crawl, which commonly occur with composite video. Although it is improved over composite video, S-Video has lower color resolution than component video, which is encoded over three channels.

The Atari 800 was the first to introduce separate luma and chrominance outputs in late 1979. However, S-Video was not widely adopted until JVC's introduction of the S-VHS format in 1987.

The S-video format was widely adopted in consumer equipment due to its improvements over composite video. However, it was rarely used by professional studios and broadcasters as component YPbPr was superior for signal processing and standard-definition TV was broadcast over NTSC composite signals.

== Background ==
Standard analog television signals go through several processing steps on their way to being broadcast, each of which discards information and lowers the quality of the resulting images.

The image is originally captured in RGB form and then processed into three component video signals known as YPbPr. The first of these signals is called Y, which is created from all three original signals based on a formula that produces an overall brightness of the image, or luma. This signal closely matches a traditional black and white television signal. Once the Y signal is produced, it is subtracted from the blue signal to produce Pb and from the red signal to produce Pr. To recover the original RGB information for display, the Pb and Pr signals are mixed with Y to produce the original blue and red, and then the sum of those is mixed with Y to recover the green.

A signal with three components is no easier to broadcast than the original three-signal RGB, so additional processing is required. The first step is to combine the Pb and Pr to form the C signal, for chrominance. The phase and amplitude of the signal represent the two original signals. This signal is then bandwidth-limited to comply with requirements for broadcasting. The resulting Y and C signals are combined to produce composite video. For a television to display composite video, the Y and C signals must be separated, and this is difficult to do without adding artifacts.

Each of these steps is subject to deliberate or unavoidable loss of quality. To retain that quality in the final image, it is desirable to eliminate as many of the encoding and decoding steps as possible. S-Video is an approach to this problem. It eliminates the final mixing of C with Y and subsequent separation.

== Signal ==
A 4-pin mini-DIN S-Video connector (left) next to RCA connector for composite video on a motherboard. Both color-coded in yellow.

The S-video cable carries video using two synchronized signal and ground pairs termed Y and C. Y is the luma signal, which carries the luminance – or black-and-white – of the picture. Y also carries horizontal and vertical sync pulses in the same way as a composite video signal. C is the chroma signal, which carries the chrominance – or coloring-in – of the picture. This signal contains two color-difference components.

In composite video, the chroma and luminance signals are combined and coexist on different frequencies. To achieve this, the luminance signal must be low-pass filtered, dulling the image. As S-Video maintains the two as separate signals, such detrimental low-pass filtering for luminance is unnecessary, although the chrominance signal still has limited bandwidth relative to component video.

Carrying the color information as one chroma signal means that the color has to be encoded in some way, typically in accord with NTSC, PAL, or SECAM, depending on the applicable local standard. Compared with component video, which separates the color-difference signals into Cb/Pb and Cr/Pr, the color resolution of S-Video is limited by the modulation on a subcarrier frequency of either 3.58 MHz (NTSC) or 4.43 MHz (PAL). This limitation is insignificant on home videotape systems, as the chrominance is already severely constrained by both VHS and Betamax.

== Physical connectors ==
=== Atari 800 ===
5-pin circular plug diagram

The Atari 800 introduced separate chroma and luma outputs in late 1979. The signals were put on pin 1 and 5 of a 5-pin 180-degree DIN connector socket. Atari did not sell a monitor for its 8-bit computer line, however.

=== Commodore 64 ===
8-pin circular plug diagram

The Commodore 64, released in 1982 (Note: With the exception of the earliest revisions that used a 5-pin video port.) also offers separate chroma and luma signals using a different connector. Although Commodore Business Machines did not use the term S-Video as the standard did not formally exist until 1987, a simple adapter connects the computer's LCA (luma-chroma-audio) 8-pin DIN socket to an S-Video display, or an S-Video device to the Commodore 1702 monitor's LCA jacks.

=== 4-pin mini-DIN ===
4-pin circular plug diagram

The four-pin mini-DIN connector is the most common of several S-Video connector types. The same mini-DIN connector is used in the Apple Desktop Bus for Macintosh computers. Apple Desktop Bus cables can be used for S-Video in a pinch. Other connector variants include seven-pin locking dub connectors used on many professional S-VHS machines, and separate Y and C BNC connectors, often used for S-Video patch panels. Early Y/C video monitors often used phono (RCA connector) that were switchable between Y/C and composite video input. Though the connectors are different, the Y/C signals for all types are compatible.

=== 7-pin mini-DIN ===
7-pin circular plug diagram

Non-standard 7-pin mini-DIN connectors (termed 7P) are used in some computer equipment (PCs and Macs). A 7P socket accepts, and is pin compatible with, a standard 4-pin S-Video plug. The three extra pins may be used to supply composite (CVBS), an RGB or YPbPr video signal, or an I²C interface. Some Dell laptops supplied digital audio output. The pinout usage varies among manufacturers. In some implementations, one of the pins must be grounded to enable the composite output or disable the S-Video output.

=== 8-pin mini-DIN ===
8-pin circular plug diagram

The 8-pin mini-DIN connector is used in some ATI Radeon video cards

=== 9-pin video input and output ===
9-pin circular plug diagram

9-pin circular plug diagram

9-pin connectors are used in graphics systems that feature the ability to input video as well as output it. There is no pin assignment standardization between manufacturers, and there are two known variants of the connector in use. Although the S-Video signals are available on the connector pins, neither variant of the connector will accept an unmodified 4-pin S-Video plug.

== Comparison with SCART ==
S-video/composite adapter

In many European countries, S-Video was less common because of the dominance of SCART connectors, which were common on televisions before the introduction of HDMI. It is possible for a player to output S-Video over SCART, but televisions' SCART connectors are not always wired to accept it, and if not the display would show only a monochrome image. In this case it is sometimes possible to modify the SCART adapter cable to allow full S-Video compatibility.

== See also ==
- Audio and video interfaces and connectors
- RF connector
- Composite monitor
- List of video connectors
- Video In Video Out (VIVO)
