= SGI Visual Workstation =

Series of workstation computers

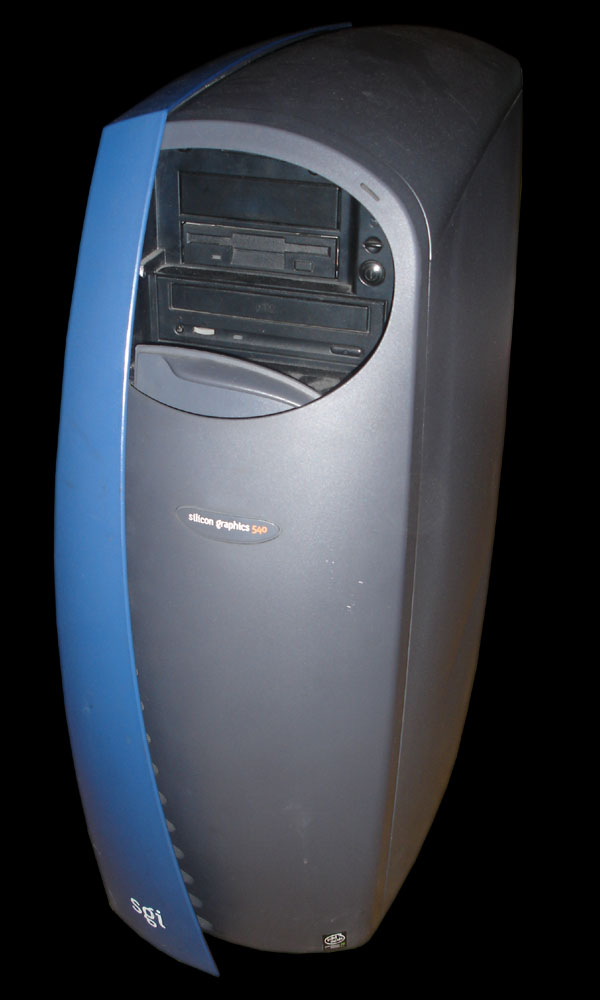
- SGI Visual Workstation 540
- Developer: Silicon Graphics
- Type: Workstation
- Released: August 1999; 27 years ago
- Discontinued: January 2002
- Operating system: Windows NT 4.0, Windows 2000
- CPU: Pentium II, Pentium III, Xeon
- Memory: 128 MB–2 GB
- Graphics: Quadro 2
- Website: 320 and 540; 230, 330, and 550

SGI Visual Workstation is a series of workstation computers that are designed and manufactured by SGI. Unlike its other product lines, which used the 64-bit MIPS RISC architecture, the line used Intel Pentium II and III processors and shipped with Windows NT 4.0 or Windows 2000 as its operating system instead of IRIX. However, the Visual Workstation 320 and 540 models deviated from the architecture of IBM-compatible PCs by using SGI's ARCS firmware instead of a traditional BIOS, internal components adapted from its MIPS-based products, and other proprietary components that made them incompatible with internal hardware designed for standard PCs and hence unable to run other versions of Microsoft Windows, especially Windows 9x. By contrast, the remaining models in the line are standard PCs, using VIA Technologies chipsets, Nvidia video cards, and standard components.

== Computer architecture ==
There are two series of the Visual Workstations. All are based on Intel processors; the first series (320 and 540) used SGI's ARCloader PROM and Cobalt video chipset, the remainder are essentially standard PCs.

The 320 and 540 use a Unified Memory Architecture (UMA) memory system. This shares the video and system memory and runs them at the same speed, and allows for up to 80 percent of the system RAM to be applied to video memory. The allocation is static, however, and is adjusted via a profile. The 320 and 540 also use the onboard Cobalt video adapter, which is SGI's proprietary graphics chipset. The firmware used in these systems is a PROM that enables booting into a graphical subsystem before the OS was loaded. In this regard they resemble the Irix/MIPS line of SGI computers such as the SGI O2.

The 320 and 540 also stand out for having FireWire (IEEE 1394) ports, onboard composite/S-video capture, and USB keyboards and mice. They differ from each other in that the 320 is dual Pentium II/III-capable with 1GB maximum system RAM, while the 540 is quad Pentium III Xeon-capable with 2GB maximum system RAM. Both computers use a proprietary DIMM module that is essentially the same as ECC SDRAM PC-100, but in a package one-half normal size. The maximum memory per module is 96MB, and the SGI 320 has twelve memory slots. The FireWire ports that are built into the 320 never functioned. SGI distributed Orange Micro FireWire cards about a year after production commenced, in lieu of fixing the FireWire ports.

Both the 320 and 540 are further limited by having PCI slots (albeit two 66 MHz and one 33 MHz slot) that operated at 3.3V, out of step with the 5v slots used by most manufacturers. This limits the number of accessories that can be added.

The other Visual Workstations are built to compete with the new Intel processor based workstations that are considerably cheaper than SGI's line of MIPS workstations. They are little more than standard PCs, and use many parts that are also available in the aftermarket.

== Operating system ==
The 320 and 540 Visual Workstations shipped originally with Microsoft Windows NT 4.0. A custom Hardware Abstraction Layer (HAL) for Windows is necessary due to the ARCloader PROM. Windows 2000 is the last release which included the required SGI-specific HAL. Because of that, and because SGI ceased supporting the Visual Workstation series, installation of later Windows versions such as XP is unsupported.

The 230, 330, and 550 also supported Windows NT and 2000. In addition, SGI offered these systems pre-loaded with release 6.2 of the Red Hat Linux distribution. These systems have the letter "L" appended to their model numbers.

Visual Workstations often out-perform Intel PCs of similar configuration in graphically intensive or memory bound applications because of the various SGI enhancements, in particular for the 320 and 540. However, it was more cost effective to purchase an entire new higher-spec non-SGI PC rather than purchase upgrades to a Visual Workstation, due to the hefty upgrade costs for the non-standard components.

== Displays and matching monitor ==
All the Visual Workstations support conventional CRT monitors and have VGA display connectors. As the 230, 330, and 550 models use Nvidia Quadro cards they also support DVI. The SGI 320 and 540 models shipped with the groundbreaking and stylistically matched 1600SW LCD, using an OpenLDI display connector that requires an accessory flat panel adapter. The SGI O2 also supports the 1600SW with an adapter.

== Models and configurations ==
The model numbers of the Visual Workstations:

- Visual Workstation 320 - Dual-processor Pentium II/III (Slot 1)
- Visual Workstation 540 - Quad-processor Pentium II/III Xeon (Slot 2)
- Visual Workstation 230/230L - Single-processor Pentium III (FCPGA Socket 370)
- Visual Workstation 330/330L - Dual-processor Pentium II/III (FCPGA Socket 370)
- Visual Workstation 550/550L - Dual-processor Pentium III Xeon (Slot 2)

Visual Workstations were initially equipped with either a single Pentium II or Pentium III processor or dual (SMP) Pentium III processors. The 540 and 550 models support the Xeon implementation of the Pentium series, and could support up to four Xeons in an SMP configuration (only two for the 550). Although no SGI Visual Workstation was ever released with a CPU running higher than 700 MHz, some hobbyists have been able to run faster processors.

For the SGI 320, the limit is dual 1 GHz Pentium III processors or a single 1.4 GHz Celeron.

Dual 1 GHz processors require a specific model of CPU, which is intended for Intel servers. Further, the voltage regulator, PROM, and revision of the motherboard also have to be correct for the setup to work.

With single processors the Powerleap Pl-iP3T "slocket" adapter and a Tualatin 1.4 GHz Celeron processor is the limit, and is a straight bolt-in installation. The Tualatin core gives a more modern processor, and the Powerleap adapter handles the voltage regulation to the CPU.

The SGI 540 has been reported to handle up to 900 MHz quad Xeon processors. These are the fastest Pentium III Xeons with the 100 MHz front side bus speed of the 540.

The 230, 330, and 550 models are essentially standard PCs and have the same capabilities and upgrade limits as other PCs of the time. The 230 and 330 are based on VIA chipsets, used socket 370 processors, and conventional SDRAM. The 550 used Slot 2 Xeon processors, the Intel 840 chipset, and RDRAM. The video cards these systems used are Nvidia AGP cards based on the Quadro 2 chipset, and differ from aftermarket Quadro GPUs in their drivers.
