= SGI 1600SW =

Computer monitor

1600SW
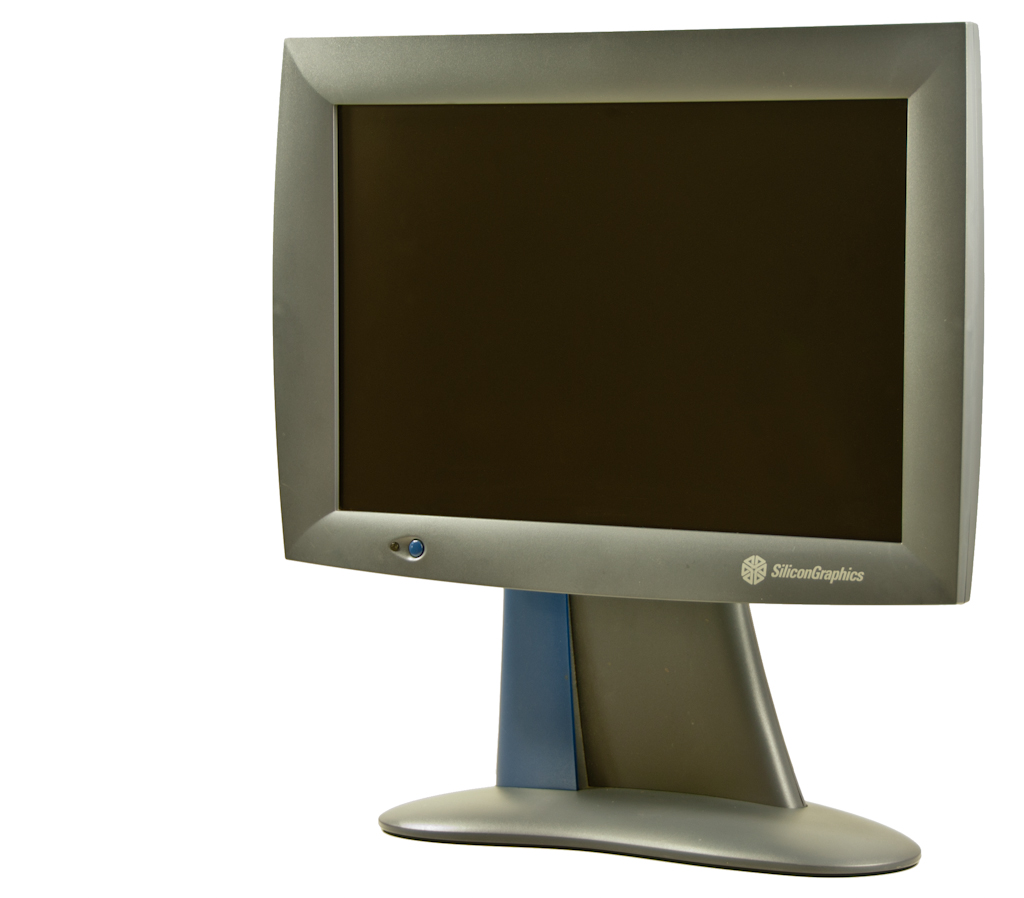
- 17.3" flat panel monitor
- Type: video monitor
- Manufacturer: Silicon Graphics
- Available: 1998
- Website: sgi.com

The 1600SW is a widescreen flat panel video monitor from Silicon Graphics introduced in 1998. It won many awards after release and sold 54,000 units. It is notable for longevity, with used models still actively traded on eBay a decade later, though difficult to adapt the OpenLDI video interface to modern video cards.. SGI released a separate device to resolve this problem roughly a year later, the MultiLink Adapter.

The 1600SW was advanced for its time, featuring a 17.3 inch diagonal wide screen panel in a market then dominated by CRT monitors. The 1600SW has a 25:16 aspect ratio (referred to by SGI as SuperWide) with a resolution of 1600 x 1024 pixels. The refresh rate is 60 Hz in 24-bit color and 110 dpi, which makes a smaller dot pitch than most competitive monitors. The 1600SW shared the same styling motif as the SGI Visual Workstation 320, 540, and O2, with a unique off-center mount. The display won several international awards and compares well to modern displays produced a decade later. It was introduced at about US$2,500 (equivalent to $4,940 in 2025).

Formac sold the same monitor bundled with its own OpenLDI graphics adapter as the ProNitron 18/500, Radius sold the monitor as the Artica which differs mainly in a translucent “blueberry” & white case themed to match the latest fruit-colored Powermac G3 and a conventional mount. SGI sold the monitor primarily as Model #AM173Y01.

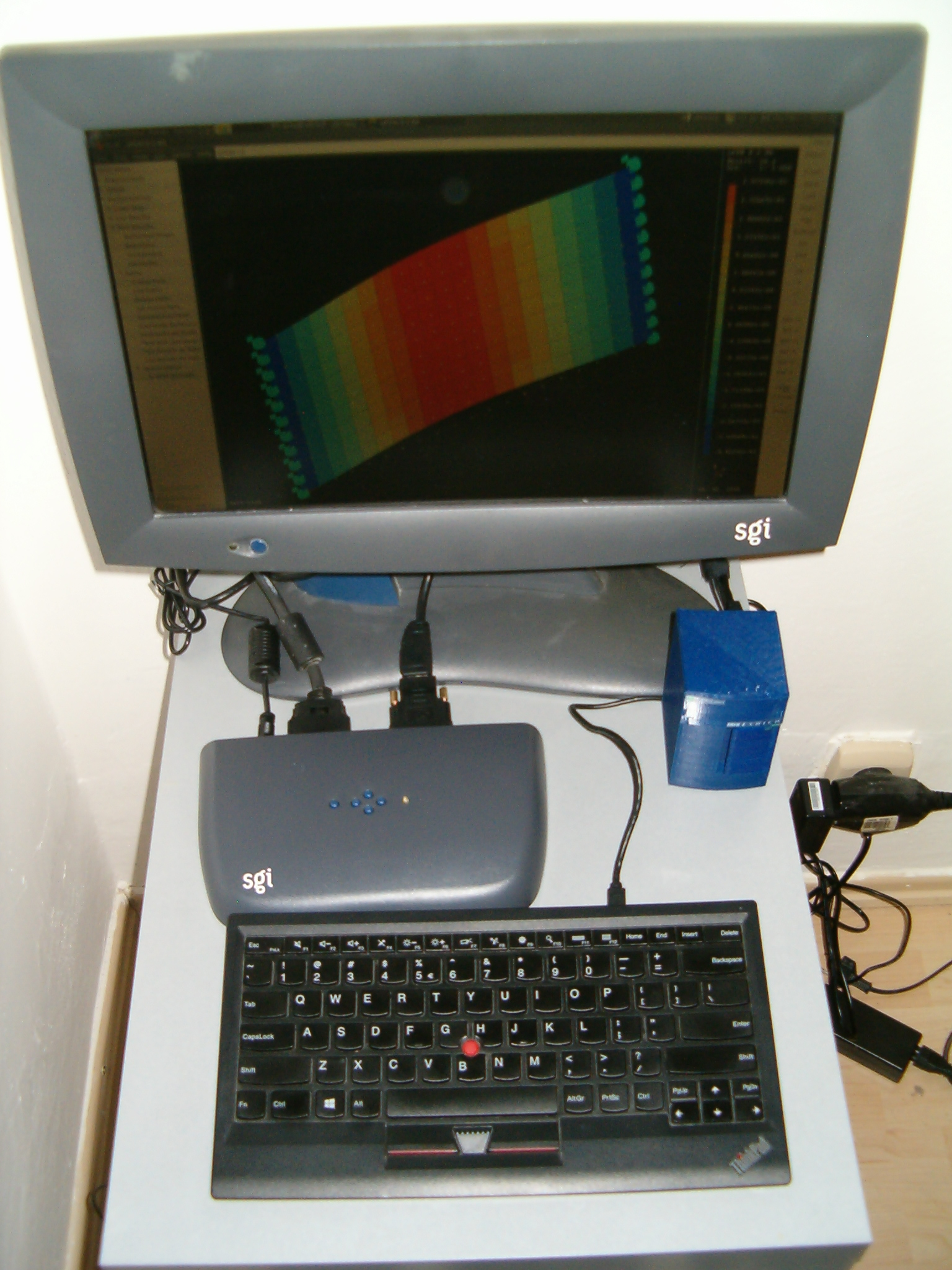
1600SW with MultiLink and optional SGI ColorLock Tristimulus colorimeter

== See also ==
- FPD-Link
- OpenLDI
- SGI 320
- SGI O2
