= V-by-One US =

Electrical digital signaling standard

V-by-One US is an electrical digital signaling standard developed by THine Electronics. It succeeds V-by-One HS, offers four times the data rate per signaling lane and is used as internal interface of digital pixel displays.

== History ==
THine announced the development of the transmission lines for V-by-One US on June 5, 2017. The new specification allows data rates up to 16 Gbit/s per lane, which is 4 times faster than the 4 Gbit/s of V-by-One HS. It enables 4K 60 Hz displays over 2 lanes and 8K 60 Hz displays over 8 lanes.

On September 21, 2018, the company announced it had working samples of the V-by-One US chipset ready. The chipset supports two 16 Gbit/s signalling lanes, which enables a 4K display or four 1080p displays at 60 Hz. The chipset is able to data between 8-lane V-by-One HS and 2-lane V-by-One US.

August 13, 2020, Silicon Creations announced that its Deserializer PMA was used as a V-by-One HS receiver in a 12nm SoC aimed at 8K TV's designed by Novatek Microelectronics.

== Comparison ==
V-by-One comparison
Interface	Speed per lane	Lanes for 4K 60 Hz	Lanes for 8K 60 Hz
V-by-One HS	4 Gb/s	8 pairs	32 pairs
V-by-One US	16 Gb/s	2 pairs	8 pairs
