= THine Electronics =

Japanese electronics manufacturer

THine Electronics, Inc.
- Company type: Public
- Traded as: JASDAQ:6769
- Industry: Semiconductors
- Founder: Dr. Tetsuya Iizuka
- Headquarters: Chiyoda-city, Tokyo, Japan
- Area served: Worldwide
- Key people: Tetsuya Iizuka (Founder and CEO); Kazutaka Nogami (COO)
- Products: High-speed serial interface (V-by-One HS, LVDS, CalDriCon, image signal processor (ISP), analog-to-digital converter (ADC), timing controller, power management, LED driver, motor driver
- Website: www.thine.co.jp/en/

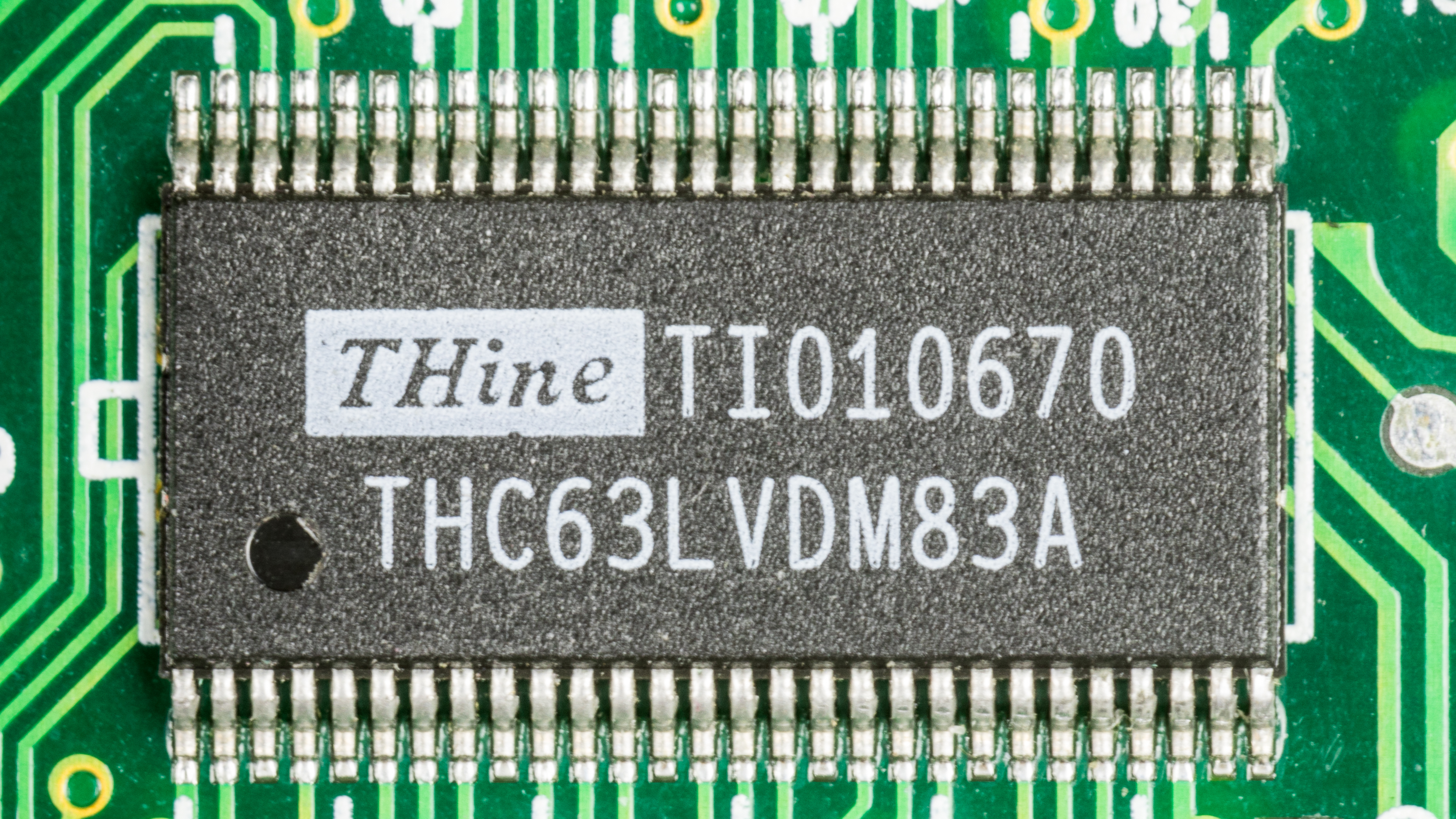
A THine THC63LVDM83A - 85MHz LVDS 24 Bit Color Host-LCD Panel Interface

THine Electronics Incorporated is a Japanese fabless LSI manufacturer that provides mixed signal LSIs and analog technologies, headquartered in Tokyo, Japan. THine Electronics also has subsidiaries in Seoul, South Korea and Taipei, Taiwan. Some of THine’s products have the most market shares in the world because of technical advantages. Its technologies include high-speed interfaces such as V-by-One HS, LVDS, timing controller, analog-to-digital converter (ADC), image signal processor (ISP), and power management in smartphones, tablets, flat screen televisions, LCD monitors, projectors, document processing, amusement, security systems, and automotive markets.

== History ==
=== Start-up in Tsukuba ===
THine was founded in Tsukuba, Japan, in 1991 by Dr. Tetsuya Iizuka as THine Microsystems. The name “THine” derives from the Old English word “thine” meaning “yours”. The capitalization stands for "Targeting High" and "Talented Human".

In 1992 THine Microsystems and Samsung Electronics established their joint venture, THine Electronics, Inc. in Tokyo, Japan as a research institute of advanced memories and high-speed interface technologies. After 6 years of collaboration in research and development, THine Electronics had completed its management buy-out from Samsung Electronics in 1998 and started its own branded fabless LSI business in the area of high-speed serial interface for growing display and image data transmission markets.

=== Starting fabless business model ===
In 1998, THine Electronics started mass production of digital signal processing chips in the flat panel display markets for companies worldwide. In the same year THine Electronics acquired all the outstanding stocks of THine Microsystems (which merged with THine Electronics in 2000) and completed its business model as fabless LSI maker. Overcoming the many challenges of establishing a start-up venture in Japan, Dr. Iizuka has developed breakthrough solutions for low-cost and compact video-signal handling. THine Electronics established its Taiwan subsidiary, THine Electronics Taiwan, Inc. to control manufacturing and reinforce overseas marketing functions including the Taiwan markets.

=== Development of advanced technologies and IPO ===
In 2001 THine’s analog-to-digital converter product won the award for excellence in the LSI Design of the Year 2001. THine also established its own high-speed testing facilities in its research site and accelerated its developing activities. THine Electronics made initial public offering and listed its stocks in JASDAQ Securities Exchange, Japanese growth security market in 2001.

THine has accumulated its analog and digital intellectual properties and has expanded its technical portfolio into high-speed serial interface of V-by-One HS, LVDS, and CalDriCon, image signal processor (ISP), analog-to-digital converter, timing controller, power management, LED driver, motor driver, and related mixed signal technologies.

On 18 July 2023, THine announced the release of its new serial transceiver products. The THCS253 and THCS254 unique LSI products are capable of serializing different types of signals and users can easily add more sensor functions within its system, which is a first for the industry.

=== Alliance and acquisitions ===
THine Electronics emphasized alliance is one of the most important strategies. In its early history, THine collaborated with Samsung Electronics, established Topshine Electronics Corp. as a joint venture of THine Microsystems. In addition, just before THine’s IPO, Hitachi and NEC made their symbolic investments in THine as partners.

Dr. Iizuka founded the Japan Semiconductor Venture Association (JASVA) to improve opportunities for entrepreneurs in Japan in 2000.

In 2002, THine acquired Giga Technologies, Inc., a radio frequency technical team, and also acquired a power management LSI team in the same year.

In 2006, THine structured “Enova” venture capital fund, focusing on electronics industry companies with Ant Capital Partners and Chip One Stop, Inc. to cultivate Japanese entrepreneurship in electronics industry.

In 2009, THine acquired an image signal processing team from Winbond Electronics, Corp. and launched its own ISP products with fewer footprints, less power consumption, higher-speed frame rates, and higher resolutions.

In 2011, THine invested in Dazzo Technology Corp., a Taiwanese fabless LSI maker, to cultivate new alliance opportunities.

=== Tack to Asia ===
THine has maintained long-term relationship with Asian partners.

In addition to its Taiwanese subsidiary in Taipei, THine Electronics Taiwan, established in 2000, THine also established THine Electronics Korea, Inc. as its subsidiary in Seoul, Korea, in 2010. During the 2010s, THine reinforced the Asian operation to expand its customers.

== De facto standard V-by-One HS ==
The technology pioneered by Dr. Iizuka has fueled the success of electronics appliances including laptops, tablets, and 3D televisions. Under Dr. Iizuka’s guidance, THine advanced existing low-voltage differential signaling (LVDS) technology to introduce 10-bit LVDS in 2003. The 10-bit LVDS chip as a television’s internal interface supports 1 billion colors compared to 8-bit LVDS’ 16 million colors and was widely accepted as the new value for image quality in television displays.

After that THine developed the V-by-One HS chip. Considered the next-generation interface for flat-panel displays, this technology can realize high-definition television through eight pairs of internal video interface cables compared to the 48 pairs required with LVDS. V-by-One HS technology can be applied widely to automotives, security systems, document processing, flat panel displays, robotics and amusement markets.

== See also ==
- V-by-One HS
- CalDriCon
