= LDI =

LDI may refer to:

== Places ==
- Lady Davis Institute for Medical Research, a hospital in Montreal, Canada
- Lawrenceburg Distillers Indiana, a distillery in Indiana, US
- Lindi Airport, Tanzania (IATA:LDI)

== Technology ==
- LVDS Display Interface, for flat-panel displays
- Laser Direct Imaging, in photoplotting

== Other uses ==
- Liability-driven investment strategy
- La droite indépendante, the former French electoral alliance
