= Current-mode logic =

Differential digital logic family

Current-mode logic (CML), or source-coupled logic (SCL), is a digital design style used both for logic gates and for board-level digital signaling of digital data.

The basic principle of CML is that current from a constant-current generator is steered between two alternate paths depending on whether a logic zero or logic one is being represented. Typically, the generator is connected to the two sources of a pair of differential FETs, with the two paths being their two drains. The bipolar equivalent emitter-coupled logic (ECL) operates in a contrasting fashion, still differential but with the output being taken from the emitters of the BJT transistors (rather than the collectors, which would be analogous to the drains of the FETs).

As a differential PCB-level interconnect, it is intended to transmit data at speeds between 312.5 Mbit/s and 3.125 Gbit/s across standard printed circuit boards.

CML termination scheme

The transmission is point-to-point, unidirectional, and is usually terminated at the destination with 50 Ω resistors to V_{cc} on both differential lines. CML is frequently used in interfaces to fiber-optic components. The principal difference between CML and ECL as a link technology is the output impedance of the driver stage: the emitter follower of ECL has a low resistance of around 5 Ω, whereas CML connects to the drains of the driving transistors, which have a high impedance, and so the impedance of the pull up/down network (typically 50 Ω resistive) is the effective output impedance. Matching this drive impedance close to the driven transmission line's characteristic impedance greatly reduces undesirable ringing.

CML signals have also been found useful for connections between modules. CML is the physical layer used in DVI, HDMI and FPD-Link III video links, the interfaces between a display controller and a monitor.

In addition, CML has been widely used in high-speed integrated systems, such as for serial data transceivers and frequency synthesizers in telecommunication systems.

== Operation ==
The fast operation of CML circuits is mainly due to their lower output-voltage swing compared to the static CMOS circuits, as well as the very fast current switching taking place at the input differential-pair transistors. One of the primary requirements of a current-mode logic circuit is that the current-bias transistor must remain in the saturation region to maintain a constant current.

== Ultra-low power ==
Recently, CML has been used in ultra-low power applications. Studies show that while the leakage current in conventional static CMOS circuits is becoming a major challenge in lowering the energy dissipation, good control of CML current consumption makes them a very good candidate for extremely low power use. Called subthreshold CML or subthreshold source-coupled logic (STSCL), the current consumption of each gate can be reduced down to a few tens of picoamperes.

== See also ==
- Low-voltage differential signaling (LVDS) – a differential standard used primarily for signals between modules.
- Positive-referenced emitter-coupled logic – a differential signaling standard for high-speed inter-module communications.
