= V-by-One HS =

Electrical digital signaling standard

V-by-One HS is an electrical digital signaling standard that can run at faster speeds over inexpensive twisted-pair copper cables than Low-voltage differential signaling, or LVDS. It was originally developed by THine Electronics, Inc. in 2007 for high-definition televisions but since 2010 V-by-One HS has been widely adopted in various markets such as document processing, automotive infotainment systems, industrial cameras and machine vision, robotics and amusement equipments.

While high-definition televisions had previously used LVDS to transfer pixel data, timing-skew difficulties among conductors emerged as data rates increased to meet higher-resolution and colour-depth needs. V-by-One HS, by its SerDes and CDR(Clock recovery) technology, achieves the high speed of 3.75 Gbit/s for each pair of conductors, decreasing the number of conductors, therefore reducing the total costs including cables and connectors. This solves skew problems and reduces electromagnetic interference (or EMI) and power consumption.

V-by-One HS is succeeded by V-by-One US, which offers 4 times the data signaling rate per lane (16 Gb/s).

== Outline of V-by-One HS ==
V-by-One HS is an open standard developed by THine Electronics. Historically flat panel televisions used LVDS to transmit pixel data to the display panel, but due to higher resolution and expansion in color depth, televisions faced problems such as increasing numbers of twisted-pair cables and timing skew problems. V-by-One HS is a high-speed SerDes standard, introducing CDR and equalization, that achieves 3.75 Gbit/s (giga bits per second), solves skew problems, and reduces power consumption and EMI. Because of these features V-by-One HS reduces total costs of interface systems, including costs of cables and connectors.

== Equalizer and CDR technology ==
Equalizer of V-by-One HS improves data transmitting quality compared with LVDS interface. Because of this specification, it enables to expand data transmission between longer distances.

In addition, clock data recovery or CDR solves the skew problems that were more tangible in LVDS interface than ever. CDR technology eliminates any clock cables that LVDS requires with particular fixed frequency clock, resulted in lowering EMI noises. V-by-One HS supports wide range speed from 600 Mbit/s up to 3.75 Gbit/s, enabling lower energy consumption than interface with fixed rate.

LVDS adopters can switch smoothly from LVDS to V-by-One HS without significant changes in products designed.

== Development of V-by-One HS Technology ==
V-by-One HS has been originally developed to replace internal interfaces of digital pixel displays.

LCDs, different from cathode ray tube (CRT) displays, have to use digital signaling to show each pixel. While notebook PCs started replacing CRT displays to LCDs, pixel data were transmitted as parallel data, interface systems found the problem that more than 20 cables were required to transmit data with 18 bits color depth for each 6-bit RGB color as well as lack of space for cables and difficulty of adjusting skews.

In order to solve these problems FPD-Link which uses low-voltage differential signaling, or LVDS, were adopted into LCDs. LVDS, defined by the ANSI/TIA/EIA-644-A standard, is a differential signaling system that can run at high speed. LVDS works in serial data transmission. As the main applications had 18 bits color depth in early adoption of FPD-Link, a 7-bit wide differential cable pair for each of 3 channels with another channel for clock became used. By this adoption of FPD-Link, internal interface systems of LCDs could reduce the 22 pair cables into 8 pairs with high-speed serial transmission. The Video Electronics Standards Association (VESA) adopted this as a video standard specification and FPD-Link has penetrated wider as LCD interface.

However, in accordance with the fact that LCDs required much higher definition and more color depth as well as more frame rate, FPD-Link faced problems that input pixel data for LCDs increased exponentially and the number of LVDS cables soared as well. For example, full HD television (1920 x 1080 pixels) with a 10-bit color depth and double frame rate requires 24 FPD-Link differential pairs. Such a case has to adjust skews at the level of several hundreds of picoseconds because of much higher-speed clock and data rate. In addition, since LVDS requires a fixed clock frequency that concentrates spectrums, the interface systems have to minimize electromagnetic interference.

Furthermore, since FPD-Link mainly uses electrical digital signaling between zero volts (the ground level) and 1.2 volts based on its standard, it became a significant constraint of designing higher density LSIs. Under such circumstances, many substitutable interfaces such as DVI, HDMI, DisplayPort, and V-by-One HS are offered and adopted widely.

DVI and HDMI have widely penetrated as external interfaces between equipments since DVI and HDMI can adjust skews. HDMI also requires hardware implementation of HDCP, a content protection scheme. On the other hand, they had not been adopted as internal interfaces to replace FPD-Link because they require license fees, have functions that are not needed for internal data transmission, and their high voltage differential signals make chip design and manufacturing more difficult. DisplayPort, standardized by VESA to replace FPD-Link, is expecting to penetrate widely. DisplayPort has a similar specification of bias to PCI Express and is expected to have small barriers to design. However, DisplayPort has additional complexity because it is designed to allow one source device to drive multiple monitors, so it uses standardized link speeds and packetized data transfer. This requires DisplayPort sink devices to have circuitry needed to discard packets targeted at other sink devices and to extract data from packets targeted at themselves, and have a memory buffer in order to deal with the speed mismatch between the standardized link speed and the speed the display requires. Multiple monitors might need data at the same time as each other, but DisplayPort can only transmit one micro-packet to one monitor on one differential pair at a time. This is solved by having some micro-packets sent earlier to the monitors before they are needed and having their data buffered at the target monitors until each monitor's display controller needs the data.

Under such circumstances, V-by-One HS has been developed. The largest differences by V-by-One HS from the other interfaces can be seen in its equalizer and clock/data recovery (CDR) technology. V-by-One HS uses an equalizer in the receiver to help the receiver clean up an incoming signal and therefore helps boost signal integrity. This boost in signal integrity allows V-by-One HS achieve a speed of 3.75 Gbit/s which is higher than what FPD-Link permits. In addition, Its CDR technology solves the skew problems in FPD-Link and eliminates the need for a separate clock signal that generates more electromagnetic interference.

Because of its higher-speed data transmitting ability, V-by-One HS is expected to reduce the numbers of cables, connectors, their related spaces within the equipments and finally the total costs. For example, Ultra-high definition panels (UHD panel, 3840 × 2160 pixels) requires only 16 cables (8 Pairs) with V-by-One HS technology while it needs 96 or 80 cables (48 pairs for 36 bit RGB or 40 pairs for 24 bit RGB) of general LVDS cables. V-by-One HS supports wide range of transmitting speeds. Engineers of set makers can adopt it smoothly without significant changes from the existing LVDS interface.

== Application ==
- Flat panel displays, including tablets and televisions
- Document processing and multi-functional printers
- Automotive infotainment systems
- Industrial cameras and machine vision
- Robotics
- Amusement equipment

== Standards ==
The V-by-One HS Standard is open and delivered by THine Electronics. As of September 2018, the most updated version is “V-by-One HS Standard Version 1.52.”

== See also ==
- FPD-Link - often mistakenly called LVDS. It is the standard V-by-One HS is trying to replace.
- DisplayPort - Internal DisplayPort (iDP) is an adaptation of DisplayPort for internal use in flat screen televisions. It is a contemporary competitor to V-by-One HS that is promoted by the Video Electronics Standards Association. It removes all DRM, the auxiliary data channel, allows the designer to use more lanes than regular DisplayPort to deal with higher bandwidth needs, and requires one signaling speed, 3.24 GHz, instead of a clock speed that is tied to the incoming pixel rate. This interface allows the designer to use one to an unlimited number of lanes unlike regular DisplayPort which is restricted to 4 lanes maximum. Each iDP lane runs at 3.24 GHz. Due to 8b/10b overhead which enables clock recovery without a separate clock signal lane, each lane carries 2.592 gigabits per second after the overhead is removed. Padding is used to deal with the difference between the throughput supplied by iDP and the raw video throughput.
- THine Electronics - The designer and maintainer of V-by-One HS.
