= OpenLDI =

Digital video interface standard

OpenLDI (Open LVDS Display Interface)
- Type: Digital computer video connector

Production history
- Designer: Silicon Graphics
- Designed: 1998; 28 years ago
- Superseded by: Digital Video Interface (DVI)

General specifications
- Hot pluggable: Yes
- External: Yes
- Video signal: Digital video stream
- Pins: 36
- Connector: centronics-style

OpenLDI (Open LVDS Display Interface) is a high-bandwidth digital-video interface standard for connecting graphics/video processors to LCD monitors. Even though the promoter’s group originally designed it for the desktop computer to monitor application, the majority of applications today are industrial display connections. For example, displays in medical imaging, machine vision, and construction equipment use the OpenLDI chipsets.

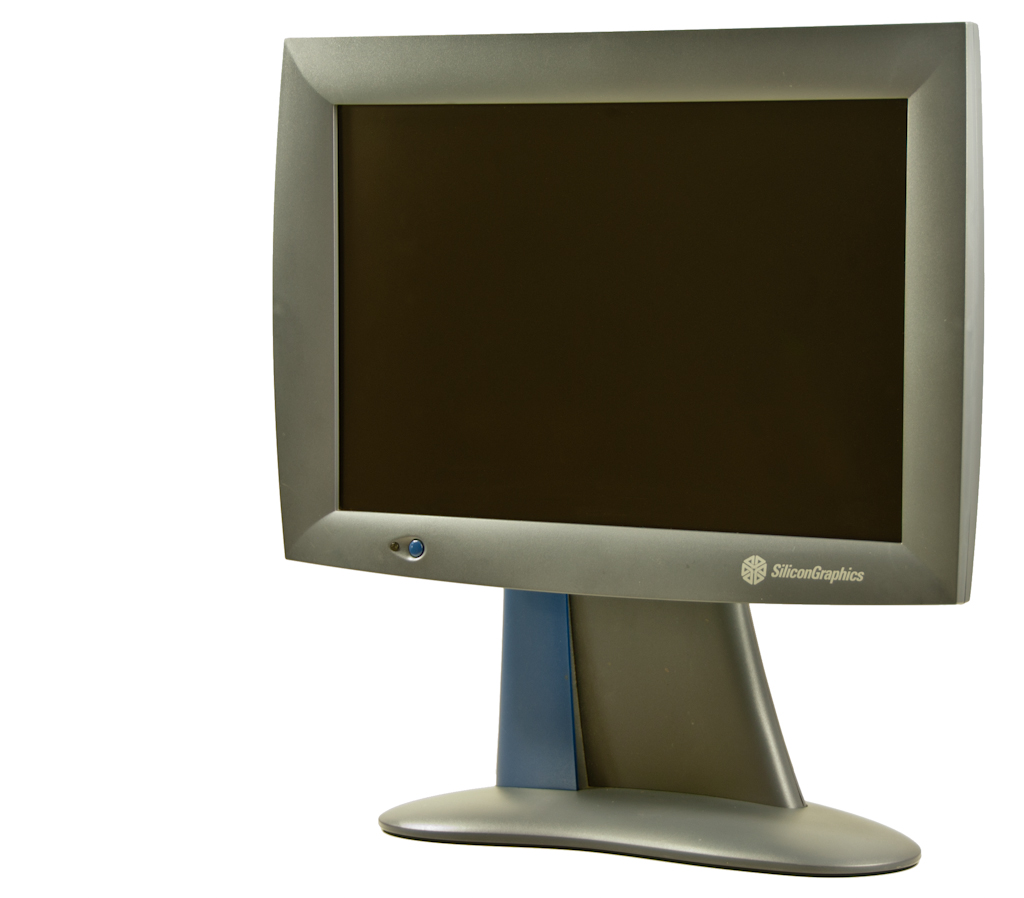
The SGI 1600SW used the interface.

OpenLDI is based on the FPD-Link specification, which was the de facto standard for transferring graphics and video data through notebook computer hinges since the late 1990s. Both OpenLDI and FPD-Link use low-voltage differential signaling (LVDS) as the physical layer signaling, and the three terms have mistakenly been used synonymously. (FPD-Link and OpenLDI are largely compatible, beyond the physical-layer; specifying the same serial data-streams).

The OpenLDI standard was promoted by National Semiconductor, Texas Instruments, Silicon Graphics (SGI) and others. OpenLDI wasn't used in many of the intended applications after losing the computer-to-monitor interconnect application to a competing standard, Digital Visual Interface (DVI).

The SGI 1600SW was the only monitor produced in significant quantities with an OpenLDI connection, though it had minor differences from the final published standards. The 1600SW used a 36-pin MDR36 male connector with a pinout that differs from that of the 36-pin centronics-style connector in the OpenLDI standard.

Sony produced some VAIO displays and laptops using the standard.

(According to the SGI 1600SW entry, a few other displays were made by various manufacturers using the OpenLDI standard.)

== See also ==
- VGA
