= FPD-Link =

Video interface protocol

Flat Panel Display Link, more commonly referred to as FPD-Link, is the original high-speed digital video interface created in 1996 by National Semiconductor (now within Texas Instruments). It is a free and open standard for connecting the output from a graphics processing unit in a laptop, tablet computer, flat panel display, or LCD television to the display panel's timing controller.

Most laptops, tablet computers, flat-panel monitors, and TVs used the interface internally through 2010, when industry leaders AMD, Dell, Intel, Lenovo, LG, and Samsung together announced that they would be phasing out this interface by 2013 in favor of embedded DisplayPort (eDP).

== FPD-Link and LVDS ==
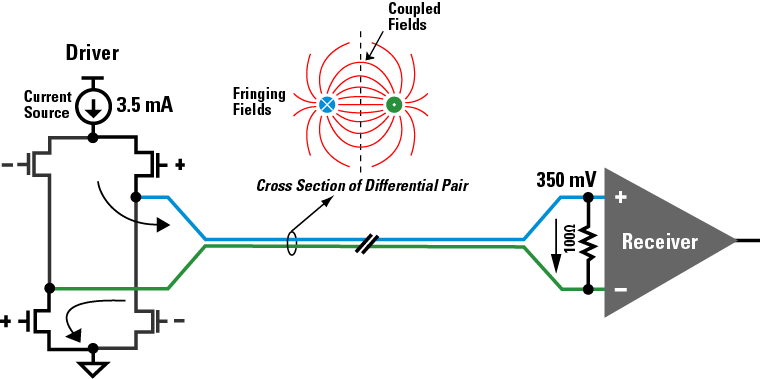
Basic LVDS circuit

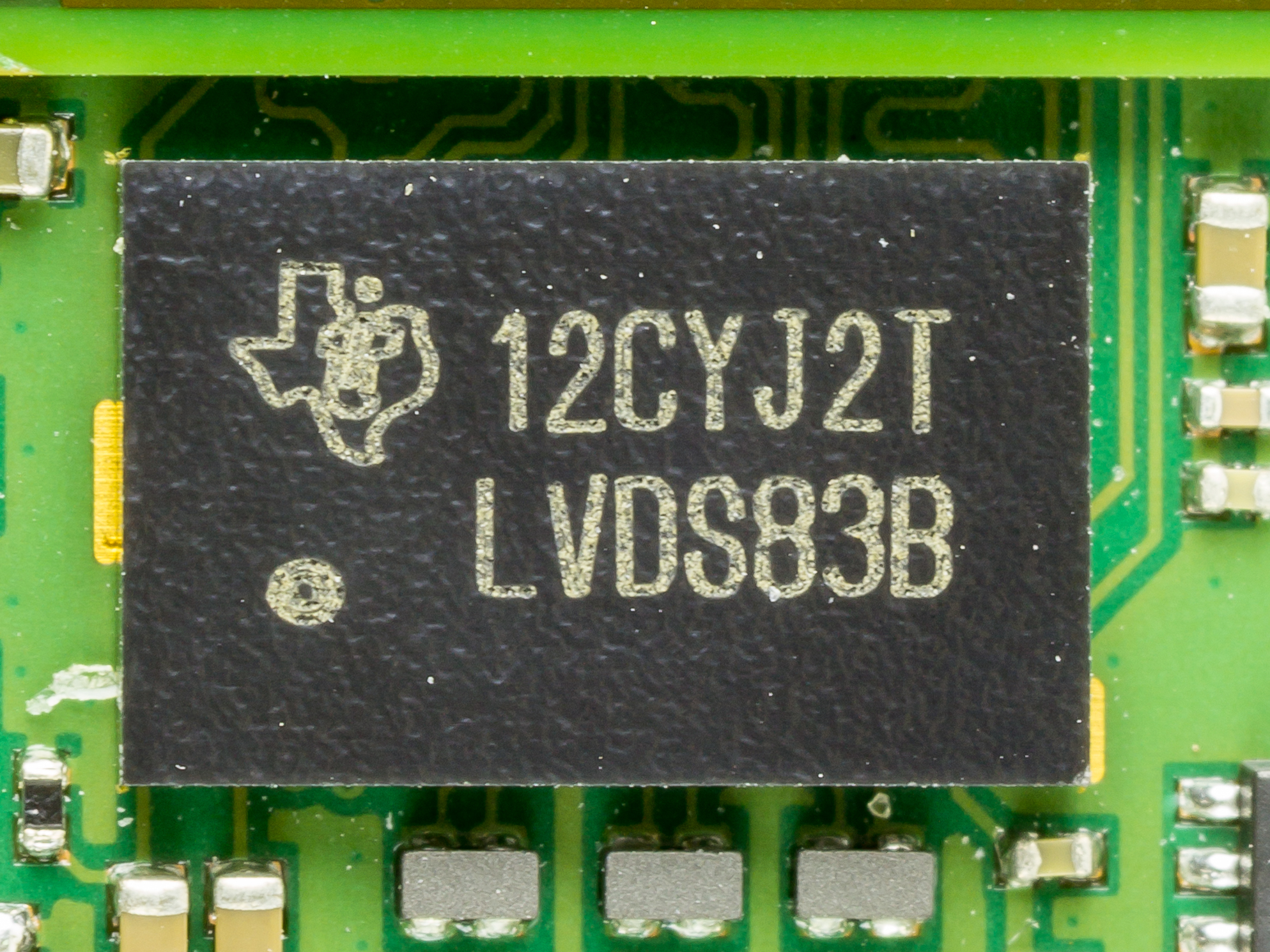
Texas Instruments FlatLink Transmitter SN75LVDS83B

FPD-Link was the first large-scale application of the low-voltage differential signaling (LVDS) standard. National Semiconductor immediately provided interoperability specifications for the FPD-Link technology in order to promote it as a free and open standard, and thus other IC suppliers were able to copy it. FlatLink by TI was the first interoperable version of FPD-Link.

== Automotive and more applications ==
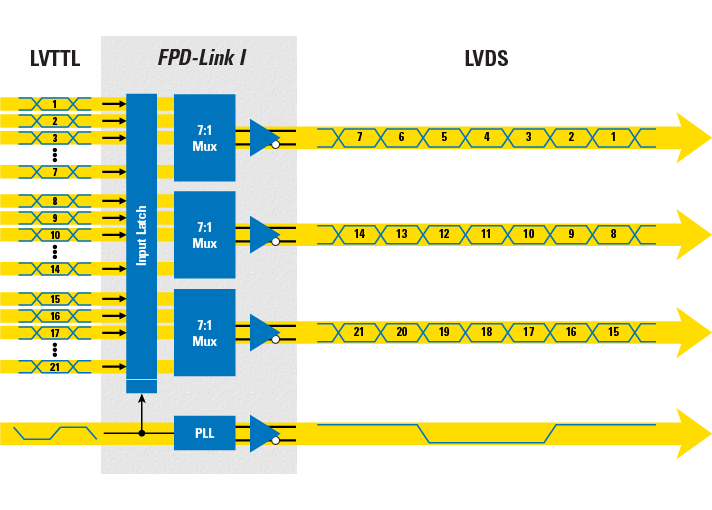
An FPD link serializer

In automotive applications, FPD-Link is commonly used for navigation systems, in-car entertainment, and backup cameras, as well as other advanced driver-assistance systems.

The automotive environment is known to be one of the harshest for electronic equipment due to inherent extreme temperatures and electrical transients. In order to satisfy these stringent reliability requirements, the FPD-Link II and III chipsets meet or exceed the AEC-Q100 automotive reliability standard for integrated circuits, and the ISO 10605 standard for automotive ESD applications.

Another display interface based on FPD-Link is OpenLDI. It enables longer cable lengths because of a built-in DC balance coding to reduce the effects of intersymbol interference. In the OpenLDI version of DC balance coding, one of the seven serialized bits indicates whether the coding scheme needs to invert the other six bits transmitted in the clock period to maintain DC balance. Therefore, each LVDS pair other than the clock pair effectively transmits six bits per clock cycle. However, OpenLDI lost the video-transfer standards competition to Digital Visual Interface (DVI) in the early twenty-first century, and the result was stand-alone LCD panels using DVI to receive video from a desktop computer.

== FPD-Link II ==
FPD-Link II was introduced in 2006 and is an improved version of FPD-Link. National Semiconductor designed it specifically for automotive infotainment and camera interface applications. FPD-Link II embeds the clock in the data signal and therefore uses only one differential pair to transmit both the clock and video data. This further reduces the size, weight, and cost of cables for infotainment and safety camera applications. For example, the 24-bit color application now uses only one twisted pair instead of the 5 twisted pairs used by FPD-Link.

There are additional benefits from FPD-Link II. For example, the car makers appreciate the increased cable length even with reduced cable cost. This is because of the embedded clock feature that eliminates the timing skew between clock and data signals. This was the limiting factor to cables with separate clock and data pairs because all pairs had to be manufactured at precisely equal length to control the timing skew between the clock and data pairs. This length matching added to the cable cost.

Another benefit for FPD-Link II comes from adding DC balance to the signals. Because the signal is DC balanced the application can use AC coupling, which eliminates the ground current problem between data source and destination. This is critical in the automotive applications because of the potential for large transient currents that can damage sensitive electronic equipment.

== FPD-Link III ==
FPD-Link III was introduced in 2010. Further improving FPD-Link II, FPD-Link III's major feature is embedding a bidirectional communication channel on the same differential pair. This bidirectional channel transfers control signals between source and destination in addition to the clock and streaming video data. Therefore, FPD-Link III even further reduces cable cost by eliminating cables for control channels such as I2C and CAN bus.

FPD-Link III's embedded control channel uses the I2C bus protocol between the source and destination in the first implementations (however, it is not limited to I2C). The I2C master can read and write to all the slaves on the other side of the FPD-Link III chipset, which is effectively transparent to the I2C master and slaves communications. For example, this enables infotainment head units to control and configure displays, and image processing units to control and configure cameras using the same twisted pair cable as the data transmission.

The Digital Content Protection LLC approved FPD-Link III in 2009 as a high-bandwidth interface for carrying content whose owner wants HDCP security. This approval enables the FPD-Link III chipsets to include the highly confidential HDCP keys and state machines to encrypt the content. The embedded control channel in the FPD-Link III chipsets simplifies the key exchange protocols between the source and destinations that verify the destination is secure.

== See also ==
- Current-mode logic (CML)
- Display controller – IC that produces the signal
- Display Serial Interface (DSI)
- Embedded DisplayPort – An industry internal interface standard originally aimed at laptop computers and smaller devices
- Internal DisplayPort – An industry internal interface standard aimed at large displays like monitors and televisions
- RGB color model – Color model based on red, green and blue
- V-by-One HS – A competing proprietary internal interface standard
