= VGA connector =

15-pin video connector

VGA connector (DE-15/HD-15)

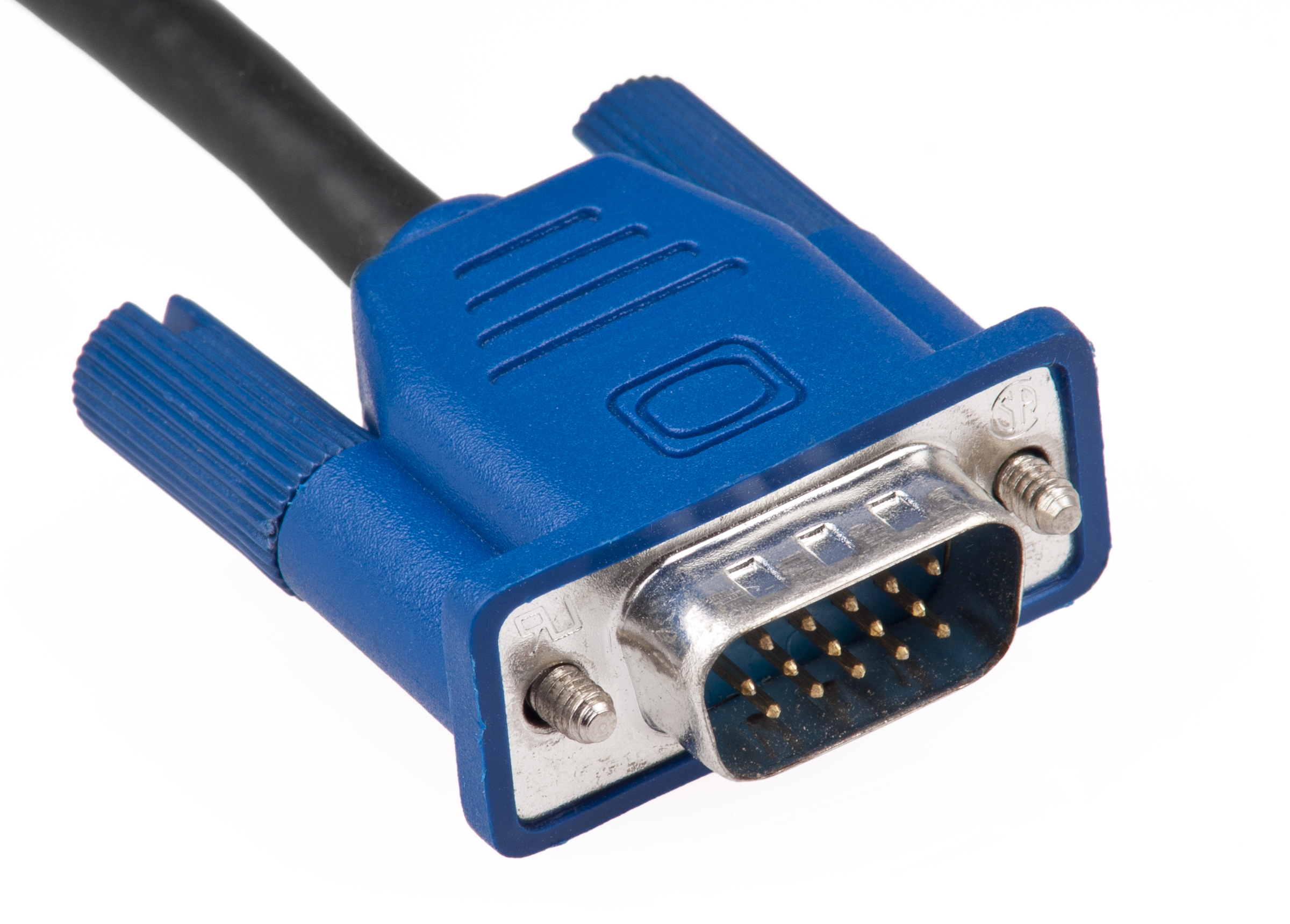
- A male DE-15 connector
- Type: Analog video connector

Production history
- Designer: IBM based on D-subminiature
- Designed: 1987
- Produced: 1987–present
- Superseded: DE-9 (IBM PGC)
- Superseded by: DVI (1999)

General specifications
- Hot pluggable: Depends
- Video signal: RGB video signal plus option H and V sync
- Pins: 15
- Connector: DE-15

Data
- Data signal: I²C data channel for DDC information

Pinout
- A female DE-15 socket
Pin 1	RED	Red video
Pin 2	GREEN	Green video
Pin 3	BLUE	Blue video
Pin 4	ID2/RES	Reserved since E-DDC, formerly monitor id. bit 2
Pin 5	GND	Ground (HSync)
Pin 6	RED_RTN	Red return
Pin 7	GREEN_RTN	Green return
Pin 8	BLUE_RTN	Blue return
Pin 9	KEY/PWR	+5 V DC (powers EDID EEPROM chip on some monitors), formerly key
Pin 10	GND	Ground (VSync, DDC)
Pin 11	ID0/RES	Reserved since E-DDC, formerly monitor id. bit 0
Pin 12	ID1/SDA	I²C data since DDC2, formerly monitor id. bit 1
Pin 13	HSync	Horizontal sync (or Composite sync)
Pin 14	VSync	Vertical sync
Pin 15	ID3/SCL	I²C clock since DDC2, formerly monitor id. bit 3
- The image and table detail the 15-pin VESA DDC2/E-DDC connector; the diagram's pin numbering is that of a female connector functioning as the graphics adapter output. In the male connector, this pin numbering corresponds with the cable's wire-and-solder side.

The Video Graphics Array (VGA) connector is a standard connector used for computer video output. Originating with the 1987 IBM PS/2 and its VGA graphics system, the 15-pin connector went on to become ubiquitous on PCs, as well as many monitors, projectors and HD television sets.

Other connectors have been used to carry VGA-compatible analog RGB signals, such as mini-VGA, including those which predate VGA, such as BNC and DE-9, but "VGA connector" typically refers to this 15-pin design.

Once a ubiquitous presence, some devices do continue to be manufactured with VGA connectors, but newer digital interfaces such as DVI, HDMI, and DisplayPort (sometimes via USB or Thunderbolt) have largely displaced VGA, and modern computers and other devices do not typically include it any longer.

== Physical design ==
The VGA connector is a three-row, 15-pin D-subminiature connector referred to variously as DE-15, HD-15 or commonly DB-15(HD). DE-15 is the accurate nomenclature under the proprietary D-sub specifications: an "E" size D-sub connector, with 15 pins in three rows.

On IBM's original VGA connectors on the PS/2, pin 9 is a key and is blocked on the female connector and no pin exists on the male connector. This means that a current VGA cable will probably not fit on an IBM PS/2 without one or the other being modified.

=== DE-9 variant ===
The standard 15-pin VGA connector was derived from the earlier DE-9 connector used in the 1985 IBM Professional Graphics Controller (PGC). The DE-9 had previously been in use (with a completely different pinout) on the MDA, CGA, Hercules, and EGA as well. Though IBM always used DE-15 connectors for their Video Graphics Array hardware, several VGA clone hardware makers initially did not. Instead, some early VGA hardware, both monitors and graphics cards, used the PGC standard of a DE-9 connector for analog RGB (VGA).

== Electrical design ==
All VGA connectors carry analog RGBHV (red, green, blue, horizontal sync, vertical sync) video signals. The sync signals are based on TTL logic levels. In non-standard use, these lines also allow for RGsB (sync-on-green) and RGBS (composite sync).

In both its modern and original variants, VGA utilizes multiple scan rates, so attached devices such as monitors are multisync by necessity.

The meanings of additional pins has evolved over time. Signaling for modern devices are defined per VESA DDC, for identifying attached display devices.

The original VGA interface includes no affordances for hot swapping, the ability to connect or disconnect the output device during operation, although in practice this can be done and usually does not cause damage to the hardware or other problems. The VESA DDC specification does, however, include a standard for hot-swapping.

=== PS/2 signaling ===
In the original IBM VGA implementation, refresh rates were limited to two vertical (between-frame: 59.94 and 70.086 Hz) frequencies with one horizontal (between-line) frequency. Different resolutions of the same frequencies used different blanking intervals, which were communicated to the monitor using combinations of different polarity H and V sync signals.

Some pins on the connector were also different: pin 9 was keyed by plugging the female connector hole, and four pins carried the monitor ID.

=== PS/55 signaling ===
The IBM PS/55 Display Adapter redefined pin 9 as "+12V", which signals the monitor to turn on when the system unit is powered on.

=== DDC ===
In order to advertise display capabilities VESA has introduced a scheme to redefining VGA connector pins 9, 12, and 15 as a serial bus for a Display Data Channel (DDC). The data provided by DDC is called Extended Display Identification Data (EDID).

With the implementation of the VESA DDC specification, several of the monitor ID pins were reassigned for use by DDC signaling, and the key pin was replaced with a +5 V DC output per the DDC spec. Devices that comply with the DDC host system standard provide 5 V ± 5%, from 50 mA to 1 A.

== Alternative connectors ==
=== mini-VGA ===
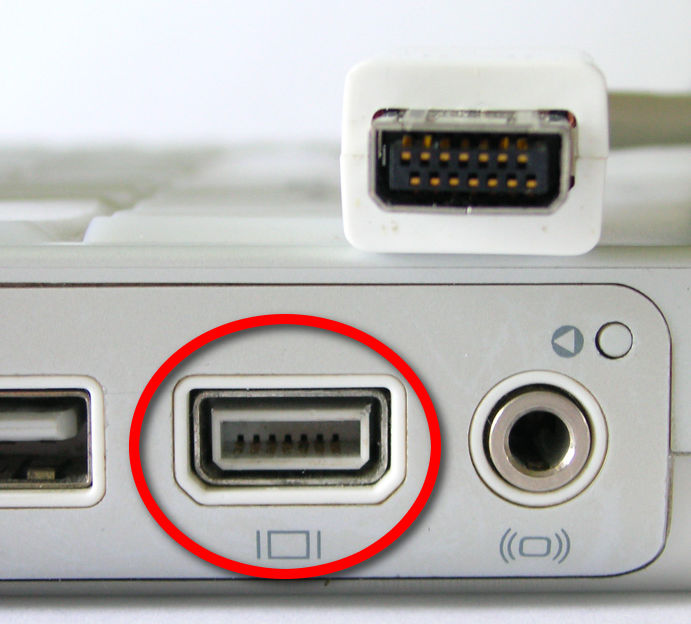
Mini-VGA port on an Apple iBook

Some laptops and other portable devices in the early to mid-2000s contained a mini-VGA connector that is much smaller than the DE-15. There are several incompatible connectors under the name of mini-VGA.

=== BNC ===
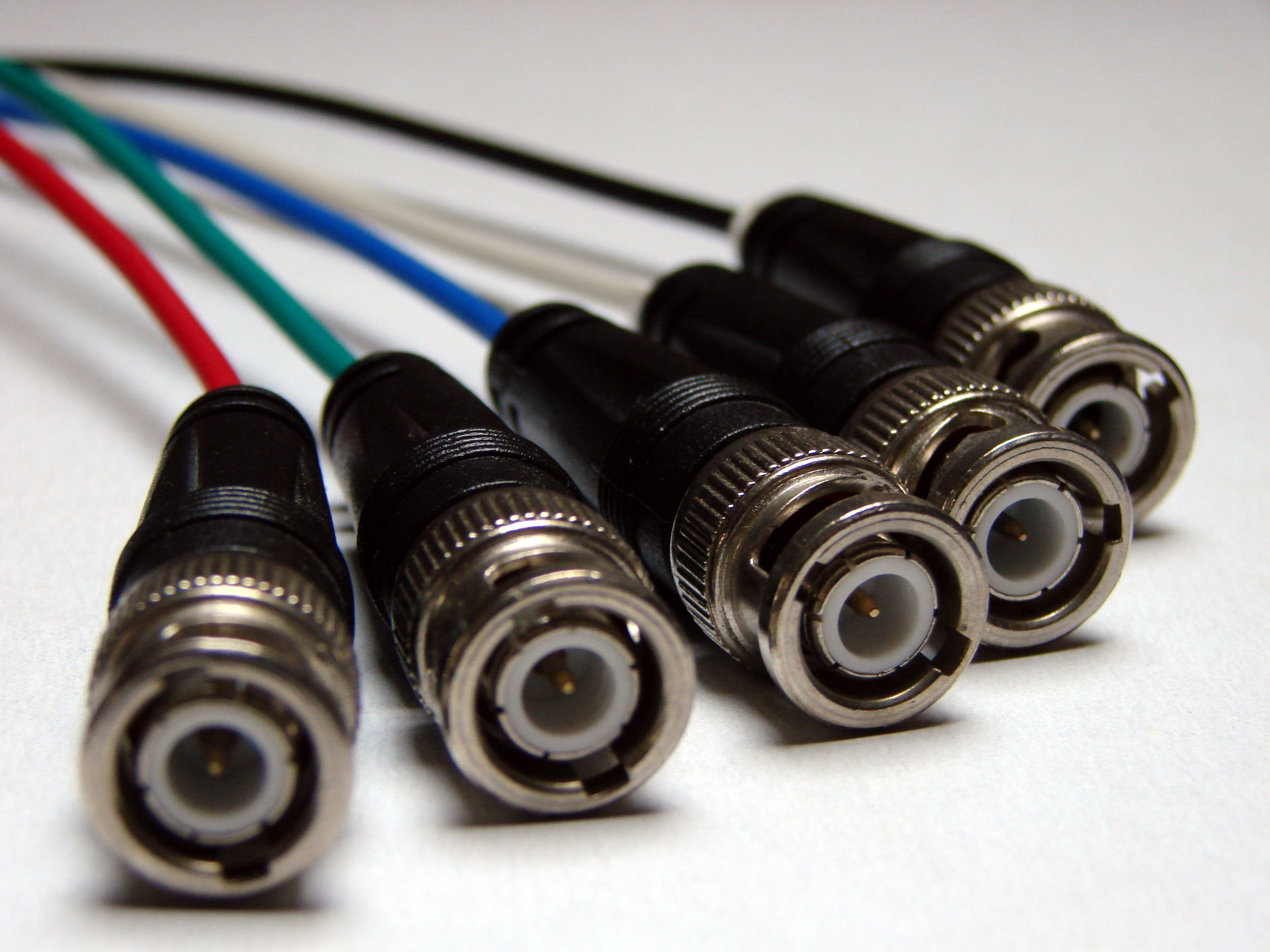
VGA BNC connectors

The use of BNC RGB video cables long predates VGA and was often seen in other market segments and industries. In the VGA era, some professional monitors, such as the PSI L240SDI and Sony PVM-20M4E, and video cards like the AJA Corvid 44 BNC and Bluefish444 Epoch Supernova CG used multiple BNC connectors instead of a single standard VGA connector, providing a higher quality connection with less crosstalk by utilising five separate 75 ohm coaxial cables.

Within a 15-pin connector, the red, green, and blue signals (pins 1, 2, 3) are not shielded from each other, so crosstalk is possible within the 15-pin interconnect. BNC prevents crosstalk by maintaining full coaxial shielding through the circular connectors, but the connectors are very large and bulky. The requirement to press and turn the plug shell to disconnect requires access space around each connector to allow grasping of each BNC plug shell. Supplementary signals such as DDC are typically not supported with BNC.

=== DE-9 ===
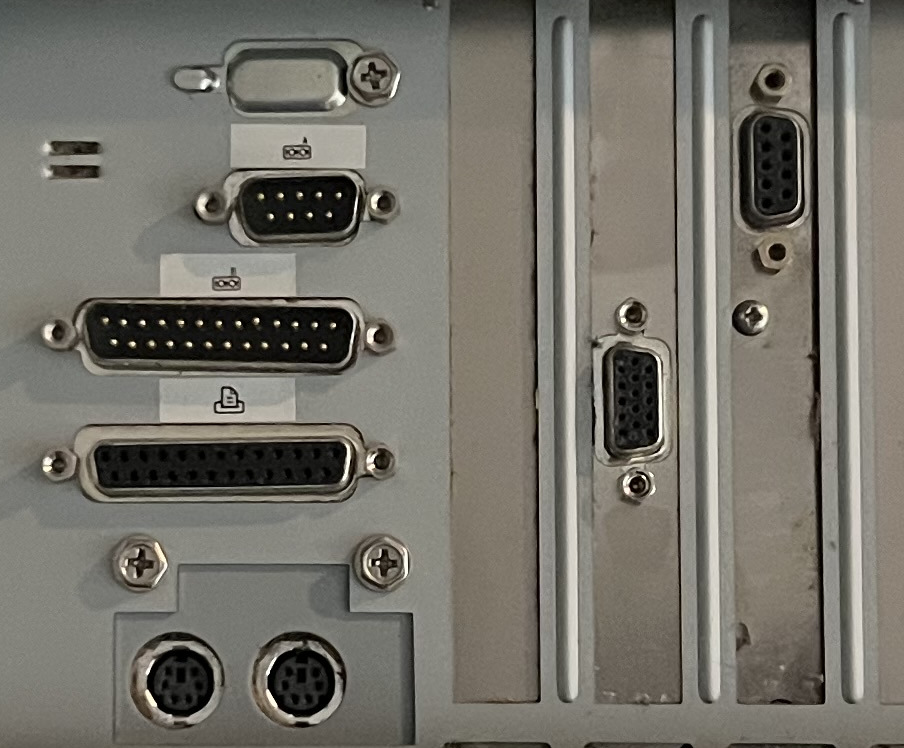
Back of a PC with two video cards that output analog RGB (VGA) signals, one with a 9-pin connector on the right, and the other with a 15-pin connector left of it. Also shown are 9-pin and 25-pin serial ports on the far left, a 25-pin parallel port below them, and PS/2 keyboard and mouse ports.

Also predating VGA was the DE-9 connector used on the IBM Professional Graphics Controller (PGC). It used 9-pin connector like the Color Graphics Adapter (CGA) and Enhanced Graphics Adapter (EGA) but was otherwise a VGA-compatible RGB signal. Significantly, early NEC MultiSync monitors had a 9-pin male port on the back with this pinout. This was used in some early VGA and VGA-compatible hardware because the standard pre-existed VGA. It is also found in some industrial hardware from the era.

This "9-pin VGA" lacks several pins compared to full VGA, which was usually not problematic because the autodetection features supported by those pins only evolved over time, and prior to Windows 95, there was no user expectation of graphics cards and displays being fully plug and play. DE-9 "VGA" connectors generally all used the same pinout, and adapters to the DE-15 standard have been made. Ultimately all VGA hardware makers switched to standard DE-15 connectors, relegating the early variant to relative obscurity.

DE-9 is the same physical size as DE-15, the latter being a high density configuration in the same "E" shell.

PGC/VGA DE-9 connector pin signals
Pin	PGC	VGA de facto
1	Red (R)	Red (R)
2	Green (G)	Green (G) or sync-on-green (Gs) (Note: E.g. the NEC Multisync 1 supported sync-on-green.)
3	Blue (B)	Blue (B)
4	Composite sync (S)	Horizontal (H) or composite sync (S)
5	Mode select	Vertical sync (V)
6	Red return	Red return
7	Green return	Green return
8	Blue return	Blue return
9	Sync ground	Sync ground

== Adapters ==
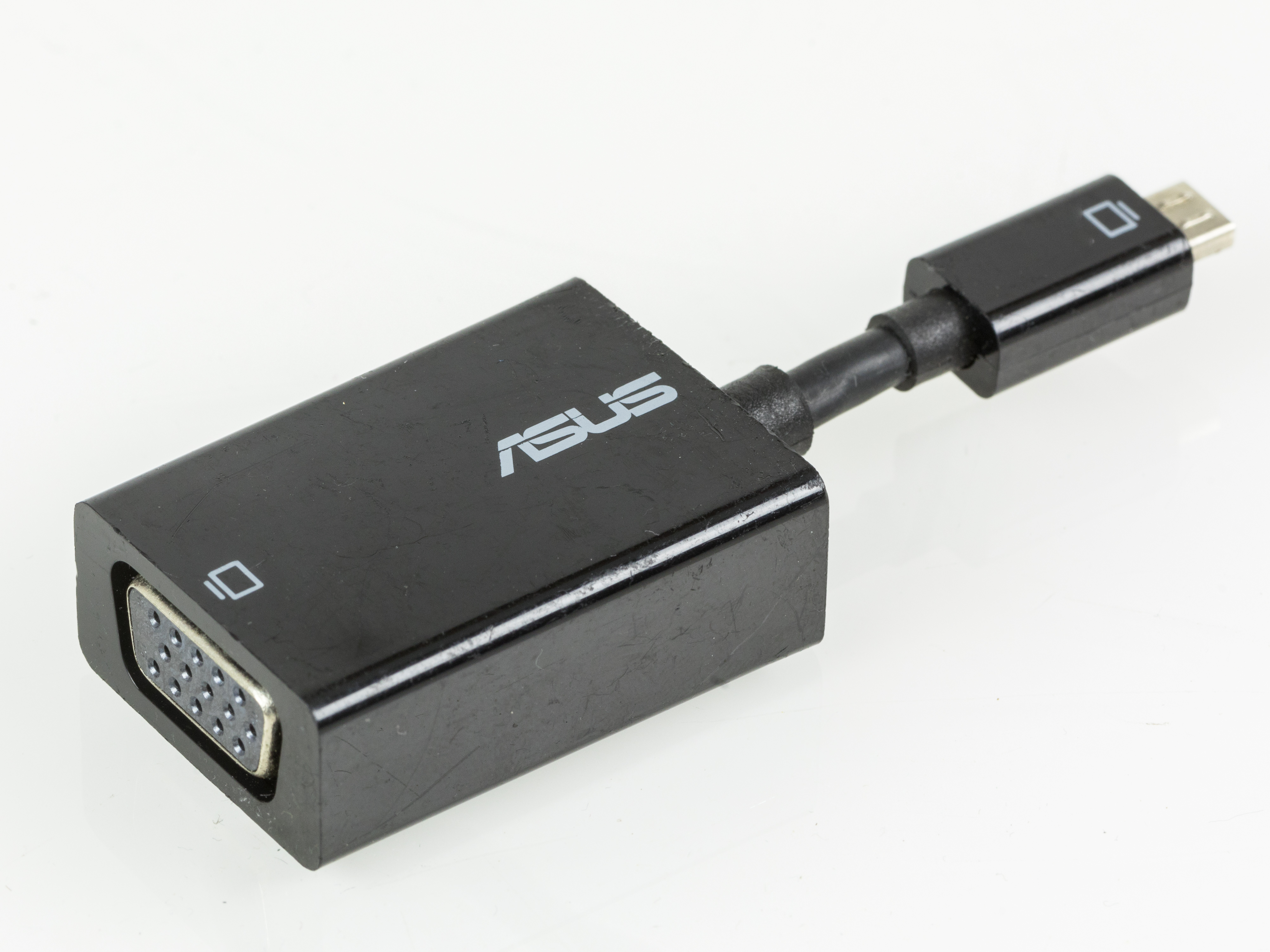
VGA - Mini VGA adapter

Various adapters can be purchased to convert VGA to other connector types. One common variety is a DVI to VGA adapter, which is possible because many DVI interfaces also carry VGA-compatible analog signals. Adapting from HDMI or DisplayPort to VGA without an active converter is not possible because those connectors don't output analog signals.

For conversions to and from digital formats like HDMI or DisplayPort, an active converter is required. VGA outputs to interfaces with different signaling, more complex converters may be used. Most of them need an external power source to operate and are inherently lossy. However, many modern displays are still made with multiple inputs including VGA, in which case adapters are not necessary.

VGA can also be adapted to SCART in some cases, because the signals are electrically compatible if the correct sync rates are set by the host PC. Many modern graphics adapters can modify their signal in software, including refresh rate, sync length, polarity and number of blank lines. Particular issues include interlace support and the use of the resolution 720×576 in PAL countries. Under these restrictive conditions, a simple circuit to combine the VGA separate synchronization signals into SCART composite sync may suffice.

VGA false plugs are another type of adapter used specifically for getting a computer to generate a display that does not exist. Useful when remote accessing a headless server with a desktop environment. These false cables are a simple resistor array with a resistance of 75 ohms between each rgb signal pin and ground.

== Extenders ==
A VGA extender is an electronic device that increases the signal strength from a VGA port, most often from a computer. They are often used in schools, businesses, and homes when multiple monitors are being run off one VGA port, or if the cable between the monitor and the computer will be excessively long (often pictures appear blurry or have minor artifacts if the cable runs too far without an extender). VGA extenders are sometimes called VGA boosters.

== Cable quality ==
The same VGA cable can be used with a variety of supported VGA resolutions, ranging from 320×400px @70 Hz, or 320×480px @60 Hz (12.6 MHz of signal bandwidth) to 1280×1024px (SXGA) @85 Hz (160 MHz) and up to 2048×1536px (QXGA) @85 Hz (388 MHz).

There are no standards defining the quality required for each resolution, but higher-quality cables typically contain coaxial wiring and insulation that make them thicker.

While shorter VGA cables are less likely to introduce significant signal degradation, good-quality cable should not suffer from signal crosstalk (whereby signals in one wire induce unwanted currents in adjacent wires) even at greater lengths.

Ghosting occurs when impedance mismatches cause signals to be reflected. A correctly impedance matched cable (75 ohm) should prevent this, however, ghosting with long cables may be caused by equipment with incorrect signal termination or by passive cable splitters rather than the cables themselves.

== DB-15 misnomer ==
The DE-15 has the same shell size of the DE-9, which was commonly used for video and on IBM PCs serial as well. The DE-9 had acquired the misnomer "DB-9" because of confusion with the DB-25 which was traditionally used for serial connection, which used a much larger shell, and this carried on to the VGA connector often being called "DB-15".

== See also ==
- Component video
- Extended display identification data (EDID)
- List of video connectors
- Super Video Graphics Array (SVGA)
