= Generalized Timing Formula =

Generalized Timing Formula is a standard by VESA which defines exact parameters of the component video signal for analogue VGA display interface.

The video parameters defined by the standard include horizontal blanking (retrace) and vertical blanking intervals, horizontal frequency and vertical frequency (collectively, pixel clock rate or video signal bandwidth), and horizontal/vertical sync polarity. Unlike predefined discrete modes (VESA DMT), any mode in a range can be produced using a formula by GTF.

A GTF-compliant display is expected to calculate the blanking intervals from the signal frequencies, producing a properly centered image. At the same time, a compliant graphics card is expected to use the calculation to produce a signal that will work on the display — either a GTF default formula for then-ordinary CRT displays or via a custom formula provided via Extended Display Identification Data (EDID) signaling.

These parameters are used by the XFree86 Modeline, for example.

This video timing standard is available for free.

== History ==
The standard was adopted in 1999, and was superseded by the Coordinated Video Timings specification in 2002.
