= OVT =

OVT may refer to:

- OmniVision Technologies, an American subsidiary of Will Semiconductor
- Historic Overtown/Lyric Theatre station, the station code OVT
- Optimized Video Timings, a standard timing calculation that covers resolution/refresh rate combinations not supported by CVT (Coordinated Video Timings)
- Oncolytic Virotherapy
