= Extended Display Identification Data =

Metadata formats for display devices

Extended Display Identification Data (EDID) and Enhanced EDID (E-EDID) are metadata formats for display devices to describe their capabilities to a video source (e.g., graphics card or set-top box). The data format is defined by a standard published by the Video Electronics Standards Association (VESA).

The EDID data structure includes manufacturer name and serial number, product type, phosphor or filter type (as chromaticity data), timings supported by the display, display size, luminance data and (for digital displays only) pixel mapping data.

DisplayID is a VESA standard targeted to replace EDID and E-EDID extensions with a uniform format suited for both PC monitor and consumer electronics devices.

== Background ==
EDID structure (base block) versions range from v1.0 to v1.4; all these define upwards-compatible 128-byte structures. Version 2.0 defined a new 256-byte structure but it has been deprecated and replaced by E-EDID which supports multiple extension blocks. HDMI versions 1.0–1.3c use E-EDID v1.3.

Before Display Data Channel (DDC) and EDID were defined, there was no standard way for a graphics card to know what kind of display device it was connected to. Some VGA connectors in personal computers provided a basic form of identification by connecting one, two or three pins to ground, but this coding was not standardized.

This problem is solved by EDID and DDC, as it enables the display to send information to the graphics card it is connected to. The transmission of EDID information usually uses the Display Data Channel protocol, specifically DDC2B, which is based on I²C-bus (DDC1 used a different serial format which never gained popularity). The data is transmitted via the cable connecting the display and the graphics card; VGA, DVI, DisplayPort and HDMI are supported.

The EDID is often stored in the monitor in the firmware chip called serial EEPROM (electrically erasable programmable read-only memory) and is accessible via the I²C-bus at address 0x50. The EDID PROM can often be read by the host PC even if the display itself is turned off.

Many software packages can read and display the EDID information, such as read-edid for Linux and DOS, PowerStrip for Microsoft Windows and the X.Org Server for Linux and BSD unix. Mac OS X natively reads EDID information and programs such as SwitchResX or DisplayConfigX can display the information as well as use it to define custom resolutions.

E-EDID was introduced at the same time as E-DDC, which supports multiple extensions blocks and deprecated EDID version 2.0 structure (it can be incorporated in E-EDID as an optional extension block). Data fields for preferred timing, range limits, and monitor name are required in E-EDID. E-EDID also adds support for the Dual GTF curve concept and partially changed the encoding of aspect ratio within the standard timings.

With the use of extensions, E-EDID structure can be extended up to 32 KiB, because the E-DDC added the capability to address multiple (up to 128) 256 byte segments.

=== EDID Extensions assigned by VESA ===
- Timing Extension (00)
- Additional Timing Data Block (CTA EDID Timing Extension) (02)
- Video Timing Block Extension (VTB-EXT) (10)
- EDID 2.0 Extension (20)
- Display Information Extension (DI-EXT) (40)
- Localized String Extension (LS-EXT) (50)
- Microdisplay Interface Extension (MI-EXT) (60)
- Display ID Extension (70)
- Display Transfer Characteristics Data Block (DTCDB) (A7, AF, BF)
- Block Map (F0)
- Display Device Data Block (DDDB) (FF): contains information such as subpixel layout
- Extension defined by monitor manufacturer (FF): According to LS-EXT, actual contents varies from manufacturer. However, the value is later used by DDDB.

== Revision history ==
- August 1994, DDC standard version 1 – introduce EDID v1.0.
- April 1996, EDID standard version 2 – introduce EDID v1.1.
- November 1997, EDID standard version 3 – introduce EDID v1.2 and EDID v2.0.
- September 1999, E-EDID Standard Release A – introduce EDID v1.3 and E-EDID v1.0, which supports multiple extensions blocks.
- February 2000, E-EDID Standard Release A - introduce E-EDID v1.3 (used in HDMI), based on EDID v1.3. EDID v2.0 deprecated.
- September 2006, E-EDID Standard Release A – introduce E-EDID v1.4, based on EDID v1.4.

== Limitations ==
Some graphics card drivers have historically coped poorly with the EDID, using only its standard timing descriptors rather than its Detailed Timing Descriptors (DTDs). Even in cases where the DTDs were read, the drivers are/were still often limited by the standard timing descriptor limitation that the horizontal/vertical resolutions must be evenly divisible by 8. This means that many graphics cards cannot express the native resolutions of the most common widescreen flat-panel displays and liquid-crystal display TVs. The number of vertical pixels is calculated from the horizontal resolution and the selected aspect ratio. To be fully expressible, the size of widescreen display must thus be a multiple of 16×9 pixels. For 1366×768 pixel Wide XGA panels the nearest resolution expressible in the EDID standard timing descriptor syntax is 1360×765 pixels, typically leading to 3-pixel-thin black bars. Specifying 1368 pixels as the screen width would yield an unnatural screen height of 769.5 pixels.

Many Wide XGA panels do not advertise their native resolution in the standard timing descriptors, instead offering only a resolution of 1280×768. Some panels advertise a resolution only slightly smaller than the native, such as 1360×765. For these panels to be able to show a pixel perfect image, the EDID data must be ignored by the display driver or the driver must correctly interpret the DTD and be able to resolve resolutions whose size is not divisible by 8. Special programs are available to override the standard timing descriptors from EDID data. Even this is not always possible, as some vendors' graphics drivers (notably those of Intel) require specific registry hacks to implement custom resolutions, which can make it very difficult to use the screen's native resolution.

== EDID 1.4 data format ==
=== Structure, version 1.4 ===
EDID structure, version 1.4
Bytes	Description	
0–19	Header information	
0–7	Fixed header pattern: 00 FF FF FF FF FF FF 00	
8–9	Manufacturer ID. This is a legacy Plug and Play ID assigned by UEFI forum, which is a big-endian 16-bit value made up of three 5-bit letters: 00001=A; 00010=B; …; 11010=Z. E.g.: 24 4d, 0 01001 00010 01101, "IBM"; "PHL" (Philips).	
8–9	Bit 15	0 = reserved
8–9	Bits 14–10	First letter of manufacturer ID (byte 8, bits 6–2)
8–9	Bits 9–5	Second letter of manufacturer ID (byte 8, bit 1 through byte 9 bit 5)
8–9	Bits 4–0	Third letter of manufacturer ID (byte 9 bits 4–0)
10–11	Manufacturer product code. 16-bit hex number, little-endian. For Example, "PHL" + "C0CF".	
12–15	Serial number. 32 bits, little-endian.	
16	Week of manufacture; or FF model year flag. Week numbering is not consistent between manufacturers.	
17	Year of manufacture, or year of model, if model year flag is set. Year = datavalue + 1990.	
18	EDID version, usually 01 (for 1.3 and 1.4)	
19	EDID revision, usually 03 (for 1.3) or 04 (for 1.4)	
20–24	Basic display parameters	
20	Video input parameters bitmap	
20	Bit 7 = 1	Digital input. If set, the following bit definitions apply:
20	Bits 6–4	Bit depth: 000 = undefined 001 = 6; 010 = 8; 011 = 10; 100 = 12; 101 = 14; 110 = 16 bits per color 111 = reserved
20	Bits 3–0	Video interface: 0000 = undefined 0001 = DVI; 0010 = HDMIa; 0011 = HDMIb; 0100 = MDDI; 0101 = DisplayPort
20	Bit 7 = 0	Analog input. If clear, the following bit definitions apply:
20	Bits 6–5	Video white and sync levels, relative to blank: 00 = +0.7/−0.3 V 01 = +0.714/−0.286 V 10 = +1.0/−0.4 V 11 = +0.7/0 V (EVC)
20	Bit 4	Blank-to-black setup (pedestal) expected
20	Bit 3	Separate sync supported
20	Bit 2	Composite sync (on HSync) supported
20	Bit 1	Sync on green supported
20	Bit 0	VSync pulse must be serrated when composite or sync-on-green is used.
21	Horizontal screen size, in centimetres (range 1–255). If vertical screen size is 0, landscape aspect ratio (range 1.00–3.54), datavalue = (AR×100) − 99 (example: 16:9, 79; 4:3, 34.)	
22	Vertical screen size, in centimetres. If horizontal screen size is 0, portrait aspect ratio (range 0.28–0.99), datavalue = (100/AR) − 99 (example: 9:16, 79; 3:4, 34.) If both bytes are 0, screen size and aspect ratio are undefined (e.g. projector)	
23	Display gamma, factory default (range 1.00–3.54), datavalue = (gamma×100) − 100 = (gamma − 1)×100. If 255, gamma is defined by DI-EXT block.	
24	Supported features bitmap	
24	Bit 7	DPMS standby supported
24	Bit 6	DPMS suspend supported
24	Bit 5	DPMS active-off supported
24	Bits 4–3	Display type (digital): 00 = RGB 4:4:4; 01 = RGB 4:4:4 + YCrCb 4:4:4; 10 = RGB 4:4:4 + YCrCb 4:2:2; 11 = RGB 4:4:4 + YCrCb 4:4:4 + YCrCb 4:2:2
24	Bits 4–3	Display type (analog): 00 = monochrome or grayscale 01 = RGB color 10 = non-RGB color 11 = undefined
24	Bit 2	Standard sRGB colour space. Bytes 25–34 must contain sRGB standard values.
24	Bit 1	Preferred timing mode specified in descriptor block 1. For EDID 1.3+ the preferred timing mode is always in the first Detailed Timing Descriptor. In that case, this bit specifies whether the preferred timing mode includes native pixel format and refresh rate.
24	Bit 0	Continuous timings with GTF or CVT
25–34	Chromaticity coordinates. 10-bit 2° CIE 1931 xy coordinates for red, green, blue, and white point	
25	Red and green least-significant bits (2^{−9}, 2^{−10})	
25	Bits 7–6	Red x value least-significant 2 bits
25	Bits 5–4	Red y value least-significant 2 bits
25	Bits 3–2	Green x value least-significant 2 bits
25	Bits 1–0	Green y value least-significant 2 bits
26	Blue and white least-significant 2 bits	
27	Red x value most significant 8 bits (2^{−1}, ..., 2^{−8}). 0–255 encodes fractional 0–0.996 (255/256); 0–0.999 (1023/1024) with lsbits	
28	Red y value most significant 8 bits	
29–30	Green x and y value most significant 8 bits	
31–32	Blue x and y value most significant 8 bits	
33–34	Default white point x and y value most significant 8 bits	
35–37	Established timing bitmap. Supported bitmap for (formerly) very common timing modes.	
35	Bit 7	720×400 @ 70 Hz (VGA)
35	Bit 6	720×400 @ 88 Hz (XGA)
35	Bit 5	640×480 @ 60 Hz (VGA)
35	Bit 4	640×480 @ 67 Hz (Apple Macintosh II)
35	Bit 3	640×480 @ 72 Hz
35	Bit 2	640×480 @ 75 Hz
35	Bit 1	800×600 @ 56 Hz
35	Bit 0	800×600 @ 60 Hz
36	Bit 7	800×600 @ 72 Hz
36	Bit 6	800×600 @ 75 Hz
36	Bit 5	832×624 @ 75 Hz (Apple Macintosh II)
36	Bit 4	1024×768 @ 87 Hz, interlaced (1024×768i)
36	Bit 3	1024×768 @ 60 Hz
36	Bit 2	1024×768 @ 70 Hz
36	Bit 1	1024×768 @ 75 Hz
36	Bit 0	1280×1024 @ 75 Hz
37	Bit 7	1152x870 @ 75 Hz (Apple Macintosh II)
37	Bits 6–0	Other manufacturer-specific display modes
38–53	Standard timing information. Up to 8 2-byte fields describing standard display modes. Unused fields are filled with 01 01 hex. The following definitions apply in each record:	
38	Standard timing 1: X resolution, 00 = reserved; otherwise, (datavalue + 31) × 8 (256–2288 pixels).	
39	Bits 7–6	Standard timing 1: Image aspect ratio: 00 = 16:10; 01 = 4:3; 10 = 5:4; 11 = 16:9 (Versions prior to 1.3 defined 00 as 1:1.)
39	Bits 5–0	Vertical frequency, datavalue + 60 (60–123 Hz)
40-41	Standard timing 2	
42-43	Standard timing 3	
44-45	Standard timing 4	
46-47	Standard timing 5	
48-49	Standard timing 6	
50-51	Standard timing 7	
52-53	Standard timing 8	
54–125	Display timing descriptor followed by display/monitor descriptors	
54–71	Preferred timing descriptor	18 byte detailed timing descriptors or display descriptors
72–89	Descriptor 2	18 byte detailed timing descriptors or display descriptors
90–107	Descriptor 3	18 byte detailed timing descriptors or display descriptors
108–125	Descriptor 4	18 byte detailed timing descriptors or display descriptors
126-127	Extension flag and checksum	
126	Number of extensions to follow. 0 if no extensions.	
127	Checksum. Sum of all 128 bytes should equal 0 (mod 256).	

=== Detailed Timing Descriptor ===
EDID Detailed Timing Descriptor
Bytes	Description	
0–1	Pixel clock. 00 = reserved; otherwise in 10 kHz units (0.01–655.35 MHz, little-endian).	
2	Horizontal active pixels 8 lsbits (0–255)	
3	Horizontal blanking pixels 8 lsbits (0–255) End of active to start of next active.	
4	Bits 7–4	Horizontal active pixels 4 msbits (0–15)
4	Bits 3–0	Horizontal blanking pixels 4 msbits (0–15)
5	Vertical active lines 8 lsbits (0–255)	
6	Vertical blanking lines 8 lsbits (0–255)	
7	Bits 7–4	Vertical active lines 4 msbits (0–15)
7	Bits 3–0	Vertical blanking lines 4 msbits (0–15)
8	Horizontal front porch (sync offset) pixels 8 lsbits (0–255) From blanking start	
9	Horizontal sync pulse width pixels 8 lsbits (0–255)	
10	Bits 7–4	Vertical front porch (sync offset) lines 4 lsbits (0–15)
10	Bits 3–0	Vertical sync pulse width lines 4 lsbits (0–15)
11	Bits 7–6	Horizontal front porch (sync offset) pixels 2 msbits (0–3)
11	Bits 5–4	Horizontal sync pulse width pixels 2 msbits (0–3)
11	Bits 3–2	Vertical front porch (sync offset) lines 2 msbits (0–3)
11	Bits 1–0	Vertical sync pulse width lines 2 msbits (0–3)
12	Horizontal image size, mm, 8 lsbits (0–255 mm, 161 in)	
13	Vertical image size, mm, 8 lsbits (0–255 mm, 161 in)	
14	Bits 7–4	Horizontal image size, mm, 4 msbits (0–15)
14	Bits 3–0	Vertical image size, mm, 4 msbits (0–15)
15	Horizontal border pixels (one side; total is twice this) (0–255)	
16	Vertical border lines (one side; total is twice this) (0–255)	
17	Features bitmap	
17	Bit 7	Signal Interface Type: 0 = non-interlaced; 1 = interlaced.
17	Bits 6–5	Stereo mode (combine bits 6–5 with bit 0): 00 x = none, bit 0 is "don't care"; 01 0 = field sequential, right during stereo sync; 10 0 = field sequential, left during stereo sync; 01 1 = 2-way interleaved, right image on even lines; 10 1 = 2-way interleaved, left image on even lines; 11 0 = 4-way interleaved; 11 1 = side-by-side interleaved.
17	Bit 4 = 0	Analog sync. If set, the following bit definitions apply:
17	Bit 3	Sync type: 0 = analog composite; 1 = bipolar analog composite.
17	Bit 2	Serration: 0 = without serrations; 1 = with serrations (H-sync during V-sync).
17	Bit 1	Sync on red and blue lines additionally to green 0 = sync on green signal only; 1 = sync on all three (RGB) video signals.
17	Bits 4–3 = 10	Digital sync., composite (on HSync). If set, the following bit definitions apply:
17	Bit 2	Serration 0 = without serration; 1 = with serration (H-sync during V-sync).
17	Bit 1	Horizontal sync polarity: 0 = negative; 1 = positive.
17	Bits 4–3 = 11	Digital sync., separate If set, the following bit definitions apply:
17	Bit 2	Vertical sync polarity: 0 = negative; 1 = positive.
17	Bit 1	Horizontal sync polarity: 0 = negative; 1 = positive.
17	Bit 0	Stereo mode (combines with bits 6–5)

When used for another descriptor, the pixel clock and some other bytes are set to 0:

=== Monitor Descriptors ===
EDID Monitor Descriptors
Bytes	Description
0–1	0 = Monitor Descriptor (cf. Detailed Timing Descriptor).
2	0 = reserved
3	Descriptor type. FA–FF currently defined. 00–0F reserved for vendors.
4	0 = reserved, except for Display Range Limits Descriptor.
5–17	Defined by descriptor type. If text, code page 437 text, terminated (if less than 13 bytes) with LF and padded with SP.

Currently defined descriptor types are:

- FF: Monitor serial number (ASCII text)
- FE: Unspecified text (ASCII text)
- FD: Monitor range limits. 6- or 13-byte (with additional timing) binary descriptor.
- FC: Monitor name (ASCII text), for example "PHL 223V5".
- FB: Additional white point data. 2× 5-byte descriptors, padded with 0A 20 20.
- FA: Additional standard timing identifiers. 6× 2-byte descriptors, padded with 0A.
- F9: Display Color Management (DCM).
- F8: CVT 3-Byte Timing Codes.
- F7: Additional standard timing 3.
- 10: Dummy identifier.
- 00–0F: Manufacturer reserved descriptors.

=== Display Range Limits ===
==== Descriptor ====
EDID Display Range Limits Descriptor
Bytes	Description	
0–1	00 00 = Display Descriptor	
2	00 = reserved	
3	FD = Display Range Limits Descriptor	
4	Offsets for display range limits	
4	Bits 7–4	00 = reserved
4	Bits 3–2	Horizontal rate offsets: 00 = none; 10 = +255 kHz for max. rate; 11 = +255 kHz for max. and min. rates.
4	Bits 1–0	Vertical rate offsets: 00 = none; 10 = +255 Hz for max. rate; 11 = +255 Hz for max. and min. rates.
5	Minimum	vertical field rate (1–255 Hz; 256–510 Hz, if offset).
6	Maximum	vertical field rate (1–255 Hz; 256–510 Hz, if offset).
7	Minimum	horizontal line rate (1–255 kHz; 256–510 kHz, if offset).
8	Maximum	horizontal line rate (1–255 kHz; 256–510 kHz, if offset).
9	Maximum pixel clock rate, rounded up to 10 MHz multiple (10–2550 MHz).	
10	Extended timing information type: 00 = Default GTF (when basic display parameters byte 24, bit 0 is set). 01 = No timing information. 02 = Secondary GTF supported, parameters as follows. 04 = CVT (when basic display parameters byte 24, bit 0 is set), parameters as follows.	
11–17	Video timing parameters (if byte 10 is 00 or 01, padded with 0A 20 20 20 20 20 20).	

==== With GTF secondary curve ====
EDID Display Range Limits with GTF Secondary curve
Bytes	Description
10	02
11	00 = reserved
12	Start frequency for secondary curve, divided by 2 kHz (0–510 kHz)
13	GTF C value, multiplied by 2 (0–127.5)
14–15	GTF M value (0–65535, little-endian)
16	GTF K value (0–255)
17	GTF J value, multiplied by 2 (0–127.5)

==== With CVT support ====
EDID Display Range Limits with CVT support
Bytes	Description	
10	04	
11	Bits 7–4	CVT major version (1–15)
11	Bits 3–0	CVT minor version (0–15)
12	Bits 7–2	Additional clock precision in 0.25 MHz increments (to be subtracted from byte 9 maximum pixel clock rate)
12	Bits 1–0	Maximum active pixels per line, 2-bit msb
13	Maximum active pixels per line, 8-bit lsb (no limit if 0)	
14	Aspect ratio bitmap	
14	Bit 7	4∶3
14	Bit 6	16∶9
14	Bit 5	16∶10
14	Bit 4	5∶4
14	Bit 3	15∶9
14	Bits 2–0	000 = reserved
15	Bits 7–5	Aspect ratio preference: 000 = 4∶3; 001 = 16∶9; 010 = 16∶10; 011 = 5∶4; 100 = 15∶9
15	Bit 4	CVT-RB reduced blanking (preferred)
15	Bit 3	CVT standard blanking
15	Bits 2–0	000 = reserved
16	Scaling support bitmap	
16	Bit 7	Horizontal shrink
16	Bit 6	Horizontal stretch
16	Bit 5	Vertical shrink
16	Bit 4	Vertical stretch
16	Bits 3–0	0000 = reserved
17	Preferred vertical refresh rate (1–255)	

=== Additional white point descriptor ===
EDID additional white point descriptor
Bytes	Description	
0–4	00 00 00 FB 00	
5	White point index number (1–255). Usually 1; 0 indicates descriptor not used.	
6	White point CIE xy coordinates least-significant bits (like EDID byte 26)	
6	Bits 7–4	000 = reserved
6	Bits 3–2	White point x value least-significant 2 bits
6	Bits 1–0	White point y value least-significant 2 bits
7	White point x value most significant 8 bits (like EDID byte 27)	
8	White point y value most significant 8 bits (like EDID byte 28)	
9	datavalue = (gamma − 1)×100 (1.0–3.54, like EDID byte 23)	
10–14	Second descriptor. Index number starts with 2; if 0 = unused	
15–17	Unused, padded with 0A 20 20.	

=== Color management data descriptor ===
EDID color management data descriptor
Bytes	Description
0–4	00 00 00 F9 00
5	Version: 03
6	Red a_{3} lsb
7	Red a_{3} msb
8	Red a_{2} lsb
9	Red a_{2} msb
10	Green a_{3} lsb
11	Green a_{3} msb
12	Green a_{2} lsb
13	Green a_{2} msb
14	Blue a_{3} lsb
15	Blue a_{3} msb
16	Blue a_{2} lsb
17	Blue a_{2} msb

=== CVT 3-byte timing codes descriptor ===
EDID CVT 3-byte timing codes descriptor
Bytes	Description	
0–4	00 00 00 F8 00	
5	Version: 01	
6-8	CVT timing descriptor #1	
6	Addressable lines per field 8-bit lsb	
7	Bits 7–4	Addressable lines per field 4-bit msb
7	Bits 3–2	Aspect ratio: 00 = 4∶3; 01 = 16∶9; 10 = 16∶10; 11 = 15∶9
7	Bits 1–0	00 = reserved
8	Bit 7	0 = reserved
8	Bits 6–5	Preferred vertical rate: 00: 50 Hz; 01: 60 Hz; 10: 75 Hz; 11: 85 Hz
8	Vertical rate bitmap	
8	Bit 4	50 Hz CVT
8	Bit 3	60 Hz CVT
8	Bit 2	75 Hz CVT
8	Bit 1	85 Hz CVT
8	Bit 0	60 Hz CVT reduced blanking
9–11	CVT timing descriptor #2	
12–14	CVT timing descriptor #3	
15–17	CVT timing descriptor #4	

$\mathsf{Vertical\ lines} = (\mathsf{Addressable\ lines\ per\ field}+1)*2$
$\mathsf{Horizontal\ pixels} = \lfloor\mathsf{Vertical\ lines}*\mathsf{Aspect\ ratio}/8\rfloor*8$

=== Additional standard timings ===
EDID Additional standard timings 3
Bytes	Description		
0–4	00 00 00 F7 00		
5	Version: 10		
6	Bit 7	640×350	@ 85 Hz
6	Bit 6	640×400	@ 85 Hz
6	Bit 5	720×400	@ 85 Hz
6	Bit 4	640×480	@ 85 Hz
6	Bit 3	848×480	@ 60 Hz
6	Bit 2	800×600	@ 85 Hz
6	Bit 1	1024×768	@ 85 Hz
6	Bit 0	1152×864	@ 85 Hz
7	Bit 7	1280×768	@ 60 Hz (CVT-RB)
7	Bit 6	1280×768	@ 60 Hz
7	Bit 5	1280×768	@ 75 Hz
7	Bit 4	1280×768	@ 85 Hz
7	Bit 3	1280×960	@ 60 Hz
7	Bit 2	1280×960	@ 85 Hz
7	Bit 1	1280×1024	@ 60 Hz
7	Bit 0	1280×1024	@ 85 Hz
8	Bit 7	1360×768	@ 60 Hz (CVT-RB)
8	Bit 6	1280×768	@ 60 Hz
8	Bit 5	1440×900	@ 60 Hz (CVT-RB)
8	Bit 4	1440×900	@ 75 Hz
8	Bit 3	1440×900	@ 85 Hz
8	Bit 2	1400×1050	@ 60 Hz (CVT-RB)
8	Bit 1	1400×1050	@ 60 Hz
8	Bit 0	1400×1050	@ 75 Hz
9	Bit 7	1400×1050	@ 85 Hz
9	Bit 6	1680×1050	@ 60 Hz (CVT-RB)
9	Bit 5	1680×1050	@ 60 Hz
9	Bit 4	1680×1050	@ 75 Hz
9	Bit 3	1680×1050	@ 85 Hz
9	Bit 2	1600×1200	@ 60 Hz
9	Bit 1	1600×1200	@ 65 Hz
9	Bit 0	1600×1200	@ 70 Hz
10	Bit 7	1600×1200	@ 75 Hz
10	Bit 6	1600×1200	@ 85 Hz
10	Bit 5	1792×1344	@ 60 Hz
10	Bit 4	1792×1344	@ 75 Hz
10	Bit 3	1856×1392	@ 60 Hz
10	Bit 2	1856×1392	@ 75 Hz
10	Bit 1	1920×1200	@ 60 Hz (CVT-RB)
10	Bit 0	1920×1200	@ 60 Hz
11	Bit 7	1920×1200	@ 75 Hz
11	Bit 6	1920×1200	@ 85 Hz
11	Bit 5	1920×1440	@ 60 Hz
11	Bit 4	1920×1440	@ 75 Hz
11	Bits 3–0	0000 = reserved	
12–17	Unused, must be 0.		

== CTA EDID Timing Extension Block ==
The CTA EDID Extension was first introduced in EIA/CEA-861.

=== CTA-861 Standard ===
The ANSI/CTA-861 industry standard, which according to CTA is now their "Most Popular Standard", has since been updated several times, most notably with the 861-B revision (published in May 2002, which added version 3 of the extension, adding Short Video Descriptors and advanced audio capability/configuration information), 861-D (published in July 2006 and containing updates to the audio segments), 861-E in March 2008, 861-F, which was published on June 4, 2013, 861-H in December 2020, and, most recently, 861-I, which was published in February 2023. Coinciding with the publication of CEA-861-F in 2013, Brian Markwalter, senior vice president, research and standards, stated: "The new edition includes a number of noteworthy enhancements, including support for several new Ultra HD and widescreen video formats and additional colorimetry schemes.”

Version CTA-861-G, originally published in November 2016, was made available for free in November 2017, along with updated versions -E and -F, after some necessary changes due to a trademark complaint. All CTA standards are free to everyone since May 2018.

The most recent full version is CTA-861-I, published in February 2023, available for free after registration. It combines the previous version, CTA-861-H, from January 2021 with an amendment, CTA-861.6, published in February 2022 and includes a new formula to calculate Video Timing Formats, OVT. Other changes include a new annex to elaborate on the audio speaker room configuration system that was introduced with the 861.2 amendment, and some general clarifications and formatting cleanup.

An amendment to CTA-861-I, CTA-861.7, was published in June 2024. It contains updates to CTA 3D Audio, and clarifications on Content Type Indication, and on 4:2:0 support for VTDBs and VFDBs. It also introduces a new Product ID Data Block, to replace the Manufacturer PNP ID in the first block of the EDID, since the UEFI is phasing out assigning new PNP IDs.

=== CTA Extension Block ===
Version 1 of the extension block (as defined in CEA−861) allowed the specification of video timings only through the use of 18-byte Detailed Timing Descriptors (DTD) (as detailed in EDID 1.3 data format above). DTD timings are listed in order of preference in the CEA EDID Timing Extension.

Version 2 (as defined in 861-A) added the capability to designate a number of DTDs as "native" (i.e., matching the resolution of the display) and also included some "basic discovery" functionality for whether the display device contains support for "basic audio", YC_{B}C_{R} pixel formats, and underscan.

Version 3 (from the 861-B spec onward) allows two different ways to specify digital video timing formats: As in Version 1 & 2 by the use of 18-byte DTDs, or by the use of the Short Video Descriptor (SVD) (see below). HDMI 1.0–1.3c uses this version.

Version 3 also defines a format for a collection of data blocks, which in turn can contain a number of individual descriptors. This Data Block Collection (DBC) initially had four types of Data Blocks (DBs): Video Data Blocks containing the aforementioned Short Video Descriptor (SVD), Audio Data Blocks containing Short Audio Descriptors (SAD), Speaker Allocation Data Blocks containing information about the speaker configuration of the display device, and Vendor Specific Data Blocks which can contain information specific to a given vendor's use. Subsequent versions of CTA-861 defined additional data blocks.

=== CTA Extension data format ===
Byte	Description	
0	Extension tag (which kind of extension block this is); 02 for CTA EDID	
1	Revision number (version number); 03 for version 3	
2	Byte number (decimal) within this block where the 18-byte DTDs begin. If no non-DTD data is present in this extension block, the value should be set to 04 (the byte after next). If set to 00, there are no DTDs present in this block and no non-DTD data.	
3	With version 2 and up: number of Native DTDs present, other information. Reserved with earlier versions.	
3	Bit 7	1 if display supports underscan, 0 if not
3	Bit 6	1 if display supports basic audio, 0 if not
3	Bit 5	1 if display supports YC_{B}C_{R} 4∶4∶4, 0 if not
3	Bit 4	1 if display supports YC_{B}C_{R} 4∶2∶2, 0 if not
3	Bit 3–0	Total number of native formats in the DTDs included in this block
4–126	With version 3 and up: Data Block Collection, starting at byte 4, ending immediately before the byte specified in byte 2. If byte 2 is 04, the collection is of zero length (i.e. not present). If byte 2 is 00, no DTDs are present and the DBC takes up the entire remaining EDID block ahead of the checksum. Reserved with earlier versions.	
4–126	18-byte descriptors, starting at the byte specified in byte 2 (if non-zero). Consecutive descriptors are present while the bytes 0–1 of each are not 00 00.	
4–126	Padding, from the absence of an 18-byte descriptor onwards; must be 00.	
127	Checksum. Value such that the one-byte sum of all 128 bytes is 00.	

The Data Block Collection contains one or more data blocks detailing video, audio, and speaker placement information about the display. The blocks can be placed in any order, and the initial byte of each block defines both its type and its length:

Data block header
Byte	Description	
0	Bit 7–5	Block Type Tag: 001 1: Audio (ADB, containing SADs); 010 2: Video (VDB, containing SVDs); 011 3: Vendor Specific (VSDB); 100 4: Speaker Allocation (SADB); 101 5: VESA Display Transfer Characteristic (VESA DTCDB); 110 6: Video Format (VFDB, containing VFDs); 111 7: Use Extended Tag
0	Bit 4–0	Total number of bytes in this block following this byte.

If the Tag code is 7, an Extended Tag Code is present in the first payload byte of the data block, and the second payload byte represents the first payload byte of the extended data block.

Extended Block Type Tag
Byte	Description	
1	Bit 7–0	Extended Block Type Tag: 00000000 0: Video Capability (VCDB); 00000001 1: Vendor Specific Video (VSVDB); 00000010 2: VESA Display Device (VESA DDDB); 00000011 3: reserved for VESA; 00000100 4: reserved for HDMI; 00000101 5: Colorimetry (CDB); 00000110 6: HDR Static Metadata (HDR SMDB); 00000111 7: HDR Dynamic Metadata (HDR DMDB); 00001000 8: Native Video Resolution (NVRDB); 9-12: reserved for video; 00001101 13: Video Format Preference (VFPDB); 00001110 14: YC_{B}C_{R} 4:2:0 Video (Y420VDB); 00001111 15: YC_{B}C_{R} 4:2:0 Capability Map (Y420CMDB); 00010000 16: reserved for CTA (CTA MAF); 00010001 17: Vendor Specific Audio (VSADB); 00010010 18: HDMI Audio (HDMI ADB); 00010011 19: Room Configuration (RCDB); 00010100 20: Speaker Location (SLDB, containing SLDs); 21-31: reserved for audio; 00100000 32: InfoFrame (IFDB); 00100001 33: reserved; 00100010 34: Type VII video timing (T7VTDB); 00100011 35: Type VIII video timing (T8VTDB); 36-41: reserved; 00101010 42: Type X video timing (T10VTDB); 42-119: reserved; 01111000 120: HDMI Forum EDID Extension Override (HF-EEODB); 01111001 121: HDMI Forum Sink Capbility (HF-SCDB); 01111010 122: HDMI Forum Source-Based Tone Mapping (HF-SBTMDB); 123-127: reserved for HDMI; else: reserved

Once one data block has ended, the next byte is assumed to be the beginning of the next data block. This is the case until the byte (designated in byte 2, above) where the DTDs are known to begin.

=== CTA Data Blocks ===
As noted, several data blocks are defined by the extension.

==== Video Data Blocks ====
The Video Data Blocks will contain one or more 1-byte Short Video Descriptors (SVDs).

Byte	Description	
0	Data block header	
1	Bit 7	1 to designate that this should be considered a "native" resolution, 0 for non-native. Used for 7-bit VICs 1 – 64 only, otherwise this is the MSB for the 8-bit VIC.
1	Bit 6–0	VIC: Index value to a table of standard resolutions/timings from EIA/CEA-861:

===== EIA/CEA-861 predefined standard resolutions and timings =====
EIA/CEA-861 standard resolutions and timings
VIC	Short name	Aspect ratio		Clock			Active		Total		Field rate (Hz)
VIC	Short name	DAR	PAR	Pixel (MHz)	V (Hz)	H (kHz)	H	V	H	V	Field rate (Hz)
1	DMT0659	4∶3	1∶1	25.175	59.94	31.469	640	480	800	525	60
2	480p	4∶3	8∶9	27	59.94	31.469	720	480	858	525	60
3	480pH	16∶9	32∶27	27	59.94	31.469	720	480	858	525	60
4	720p	16∶9	1∶1	74.25	60	45.0	1280	720	1650	750	60
5	1080i	16∶9	1∶1	74.25	60	33.75	1920	540	2200	562.5	60
6	480i	4∶3	8∶9	27	59.94	15.734	1440	240	1716	262.5	60
7	480iH	16∶9	32∶27	27	59.94	15.734	1440	240	1716	262.5	60
8	240p	4∶3	4∶9	27	59.826	15.734	1440	240	1716	262.5	60
9	240pH	16∶9	16∶27	27	59.826	15.734	1440	240	1716	262.5	60
10	480i4x	4∶3	2:9-20:9	54	59.94	15.734	2880	240	3432	262.5	60
11	480i4xH	16∶9	8:27-80:27	54	59.94	15.734	2880	240	3432	262.5	60
12	240p4x	4∶3	1:9-10:9	54	60	15.734	2880	240	3432	262.5	60
13	240p4xH	16∶9	4:27-40:27	54	60	15.734	2880	240	3432	262.5	60
14	480p2x	4∶3	4:9, 8∶9	54	59.94	31.469	1440	480	1716	525	60
15	480p2xH	16∶9	16:27, 32∶27	54	59.94	31.469	1440	480	1716	525	60
16	1080p	16∶9	1∶1	148.5	60	67.5	1920	1080	2200	1125	60
17	576p	4∶3	16∶15	27	50	31.25	720	576	864	625	50
18	576pH	16∶9	64∶45	27	50	31.25	720	576	864	625	50
19	720p50	16∶9	1∶1	74.25	50	37.5	1280	720	1980	750	50
20	1080i25	16∶9	1∶1	74.25	50	28.125	1920	540	2640	562.5	50
21	576i	4∶3	16∶15	27	50	15.625	1440	288	1728	312.5	50
22	576iH	16∶9	64∶45	27	50	15.625	1440	288	1728	312.5	50
23	288p	4∶3	8∶15	27	50	15.625	1440	288	1728	313	50
24	288pH	16∶9	32∶45	27	50	15.625	1440	288	1728	313	50
25	576i4x	4∶3	2:15-20:15	54	50	15.625	2880	288	3456	312.5	50
26	576i4xH	16∶9	16:45-160:45	54	50	15.625	2880	288	3456	312.5	50
27	288p4x	4∶3	1:15-10:15	54	50	15.625	2880	288	3456	313	50
28	288p4xH	16∶9	8:45-80:45	54	50	15.625	2880	288	3456	313	50
29	576p2x	4∶3	8:15, 16∶15	54	50	31.25	1440	576	1728	625	50
30	576p2xH	16∶9	32:45, 64∶45	54	50	31.25	1440	576	1728	625	50
31	1080p50	16∶9	1∶1	148.5	50	56.25	1920	1080	2640	1125	50
32	1080p24	16∶9	1∶1	74.25	23.98/24	27	1920	1080	2750	1125	Low
33	1080p25	16∶9	1∶1	74.25	25	28.125	1920	1080	2640	1125	Low
34	1080p30	16∶9	1∶1	74.25	29.97/30	33.75	1920	1080	2200	1125	Low
35	480p4x	4∶3	2:9, 4:9, 8∶9	108	59.94	31.469	2880	240	3432	262.5	60
36	480p4xH	16∶9	8:27, 16:27, 32∶27	108	59.94	31.469	2880	240	3432	262.5	60
37	576p4x	4∶3	4:15, 8:15, 16∶15	108	50	31.25	2880	576	3456	625	50
38	576p4xH	16∶9	16:45, 32:45, 64∶45	108	50	31.25	2880	576	3456	625	50
39	1080i25	16∶9	1∶1	72	50	31.25	1920	540	2304	625	50
40	1080i50	16∶9	1∶1	148.5	100	56.25	1920	540	2640	562.5	100
41	720p100	16∶9	1∶1	148.5	100	45.0	1280	720	1980	750	100
42	576p100	4∶3	16∶15	54	100	62.5	720	576	864	625	100
43	576p100H	16∶9	64∶45	54	100	62.5	720	576	864	625	100
44	576i50	4∶3	16∶15	54	100	31.25	1440	576	1728	625	100
45	576i50H	16∶9	64∶45	54	100	31.25	1440	576	1728	625	100
46	1080i60	16∶9	1∶1	148.5	119.88/120	67.5	1920	540	2200	562.5	120
47	720p120	16∶9	1∶1	148.5	119.88/120	90.0	1280	720	1650	750	120
48	480p119	4∶3	8∶9	54	119.88/120	62.937	720	480	858	525	120
49	480p119H	16∶9	32∶27	54	119.88/120	62.937	720	480	858	525	120
50	480i59	4∶3	16∶15	54	119.88/120	31.469	1440	480	1716	525	120
51	480i59H	16∶9	64∶45	54	119.88/120	31.469	1440	480	1716	525	120
52	576p200	4∶3	16∶15	108	200	125.0	720	576	864	625	200
53	576p200H	16∶9	64∶45	108	200	125.0	720	576	864	625	200
54	576i100	4∶3	16∶15	108	200	62.5	1440	288	1728	312.5	200
55	576i100H	16∶9	64∶45	108	200	62.5	1440	288	1728	312.5	200
56	480p239	4∶3	8∶9	108	239.76	125.874	720	480	858	525	240
57	480p239H	16∶9	32∶27	108	239.76	125.874	720	480	858	525	240
58	480i119	4∶3	8∶9	108	239.76	62.937	1440	240	1716	262.5	240
59	480i119H	16∶9	32∶27	108	239.76	62.937	1440	240	1716	262.5	240
60	720p24	16∶9	1∶1	59.4	23.98/24	18.0	1280	720	3300	750	Low
61	720p25	16∶9	1∶1	74.25	25	18.75	1280	720	3960	750	Low
62	720p30	16∶9	1∶1	74.25	29.97/30	22.5	1280	720	3300	750	Low
63	1080p120	16∶9	1∶1	297	119.88/120	135.0	1920	1080	2200	1125	120
64	1080p100	16∶9	1∶1	297	100	112.5	1920	1080	2640	1125	100
65	720p24	64∶27	4∶3	59.4	23.98/24	18.0	1280	720	3300	750	Low
66	720p25	64∶27	4∶3	74.25	25	18.75	1280	720	3960	750	Low
67	720p30	64∶27	4∶3	74.25	29.97/30	22.5	1280	720	3300	750	Low
68	720p50	64∶27	4∶3	74.25	50	37.5	1280	720	1980	750	50
69	720p	64∶27	4∶3	74.25	60	45.0	1280	720	1650	750	60
70	720p100	64∶27	4∶3	148.5	100	75.0	1280	720	1980	750	100
71	720p120	64∶27	4∶3	148.5	119.88/120	90.0	1280	720	1650	750	120
72	1080p24	64∶27	4∶3	74.25	23.98/24	27	1920	1080	2750	1125	Low
73	1080p25	64∶27	4∶3	74.25	25	28.125	1920	1080	2640	1125	Low
74	1080p30	64∶27	4∶3	74.25	29.97/30	33.75	1920	1080	2200	1125	Low
75	1080p50	64∶27	4∶3	148.5	50	56.25	1920	1080	2640	1125	50
76	1080p	64∶27	4∶3	148.5	60	67.5	1920	1080	2200	1125	60
77	1080p100	64∶27	4∶3	297.0	100	112.5	1920	1080	2640	1125	100
78	1080p120	64∶27	4∶3	297.0	119.88/120	135.0	1920	1080	2200	1125	120
79	720p2x24	64∶27	64∶63	59.4	23.98/24	18.0	1680	720	3300	750	Low
80	720p2x25	64∶27	64∶63	59.4	25	18.75	1680	720	3168	750	Low
81	720p2x30	64∶27	64∶63	59.4	29.97/30	22.5	1680	720	2640	750	Low
82	720p2x50	64∶27	64∶63	82.5	50	37.5	1680	720	2200	750	50
83	720p2x	64∶27	64∶63	99	60	45.0	1680	720	2200	750	60
84	720p2x100	64∶27	64∶63	165	100	82.5	1680	720	2000	825	100
85	720p2x120	64∶27	64∶63	198	119.88/120	99.0	1680	720	2000	825	120
86	1080p2x24	64∶27	1∶1	99	23.98/24	26.4	2560	1080	3750	1100	Low
87	1080p2x25	64∶27	1∶1	90	25	28.125	2560	1080	3200	1125	Low
88	1080p2x30	64∶27	1∶1	118.8	29.97/30	33.75	2560	1080	3520	1125	Low
89	1080p2x50	64∶27	1∶1	185.625	50	56.25	2560	1080	3000	1125	50
90	1080p2x	64∶27	1∶1	198	60	66.0	2560	1080	3000	1100	60
91	1080p2x100	64∶27	1∶1	371.25	100	125.0	2560	1080	2970	1250	100
92	1080p2x120	64∶27	1∶1	495	119.88/120	150.0	2560	1080	3300	1250	120
93	2160p24	16∶9	1∶1	297	23.98/24	54	3840	2160	5500	2250	Low
94	2160p25	16∶9	1∶1	297	25	56.25	3840	2160	5280	2250	Low
95	2160p30	16∶9	1∶1	297	29.97/30	67.5	3840	2160	4400	2250	Low
96	2160p50	16∶9	1∶1	594	50	112.5	3840	2160	5280	2250	50
97	2160p60	16∶9	1∶1	594	60	135.0	3840	2160	4400	2250	60
98	2160p24	256∶135	1∶1	297	23.98/24	67.5	4096	2160	5500	2250	Low
99	2160p25	256∶135	1∶1	297	25	112.5	4096	2160	5280	2250	Low
100	2160p30	256∶135	1∶1	297	29.97/30	135.0	4096	2160	4400	2250	Low
101	2160p50	256∶135	1∶1	594	50	112.5	4096	2160	5280	2250	50
102	2160p	256∶135	1∶1	594	60	135.0	4096	2160	4400	2250	60
103	2160p24	64∶27	4∶3	297	23.98/24	67.5	3840	2160	5500	2250	Low
104	2160p25	64∶27	4∶3	297	25	112.5	3840	2160	5280	2250	Low
105	2160p30	64∶27	4∶3	297	29.97/30	135.0	3840	2160	4400	2250	Low
106	2160p50	64∶27	4∶3	594	50	112.5	3840	2160	5280	2250	50
107	2160p	64∶27	4∶3	594	60	135.0	3840	2160	4400	2250	60
108	720p48	16∶9	1∶1	90	47.96/48	36.0	1280	720	2500	750	Low
109	720p48	64∶27	4∶3	90	47.96/48	36.0	1280	720	2500	750	Low
110	720p2x48	64∶27	64∶63	99	47.96/48	36.0	1680	720	2750	825	Low
111	1080p48	16∶9	1∶1	148.5	47.96/48	54	1920	1080	2750	1125	Low
112	1080p48	64∶27	4∶3	148.5	47.96/48	54	1920	1080	2750	1125	Low
113	1080p2x48	64∶27	1∶1	198	47.96/48	52.8	2560	1080	3750	1100	Low
114	2160p48	16∶9	1∶1	594	47.96/48	108	3840	2160	5500	2250	Low
115	2160p48	256∶135	1∶1	594	47.96/48	108	4096	2160	5500	2250	Low
116	2160p48	64∶27	4∶3	594	47.96/48	108	3840	2160	5500	2250	Low
117	2160p100	16∶9	1∶1	1188	100	225.0	3840	2160	5280	2250	100
118	2160p120	16∶9	1∶1	1188	119.88/120	270.0	3840	2160	4400	2250	120
119	2160p100	64∶27	4∶3	1188	100	225.0	3840	2160	5280	2250	100
120	2160p120	64∶27	4∶3	1188	119.88/120	270.0	3840	2160	4400	2250	120
121	2160p2x24	64∶27	1∶1	396	23.98/24	52.8	5120	2160	7500	2200	Low
122	2160p2x25	64∶27	1∶1	396	25	55.0	5120	2160	7200	2200	Low
123	2160p2x30	64∶27	1∶1	396	29.97/30	66.0	5120	2160	6000	2200	Low
124	2160p2x48	64∶27	1∶1	742.5	47.96/48	118.8	5120	2160	6250	2450	Low
125	2160p2x50	64∶27	1∶1	742.5	50	112.5	5120	2160	6600	2250	50
126	2160p2x	64∶27	1∶1	742.5	60	135.0	5120	2160	5500	2250	60
127	2160p2x100	64∶27	1∶1	1485	100	225.0	5120	2160	6600	2250	100
129—192	reserved, value range is used in SVD to indicate native timing for numbers 1—64.										
193	2160p2x120	64∶27	1∶1	1485.0	119.88/120	270	5120	2160	5500	2250	120
194	4320p24	16∶9	1∶1	1188.0	23.98/24	108	7680	4320	11000	4500	Low
195	4320p25	16∶9	1∶1	1188.0	25	110	7680	4320	10800	4400	Low
196	4320p30	16∶9	1∶1	1188.0	29.97/30	132	7680	4320	9000	4400	Low
197	4320p48	16∶9	1∶1	2376.0	47.96/48	216	7680	4320	11000	4500	Low
198	4320p50	16∶9	1∶1	2376.0	50	220	7680	4320	10800	4400	50
199	4320p	16∶9	1∶1	2376.0	60	264	7680	4320	9000	4400	60
200	4320p100	16∶9	1∶1	4752.0	100	450	7680	4320	10560	4500	100
201	4320p120	16∶9	1∶1	4752.0	119.88/120	540	7680	4320	8800	4500	120
202	4320p24	64∶27	4∶3	1188.0	23.98/24	108	7680	4320	11000	4500	Low
203	4320p25	64∶27	4∶3	1188.0	25	110	7680	4320	10800	4400	Low
204	4320p30	64∶27	4∶3	1188.0	29.97/30	132	7680	4320	9000	4400	Low
205	4320p48	64∶27	4∶3	2376.0	47.96/48	216	7680	4320	11000	4500	Low
206	4320p50	64∶27	4∶3	2376.0	50	220	7680	4320	10800	4400	50
207	4320p	64∶27	4∶3	2376.0	60	264	7680	4320	9000	4400	60
208	4320p100	64∶27	4∶3	4752.0	100	450	7680	4320	10560	4500	100
209	4320p120	64∶27	4∶3	4752.0	119.88/120	540	7680	4320	8800	4500	120
210	4320p2x24	64∶27	1∶1	1485.0	23.98/24	118.8	10240	4320	12500	4950	Low
211	4320p2x25	64∶27	1∶1	1485.0	25	110	10240	4320	13500	4400	Low
212	4320p2x30	64∶27	1∶1	1485.0	29.97/30	135	10240	4320	11000	4500	Low
213	4320p2x48	64∶27	1∶1	2970.0	47.96/48	237.6	10240	4320	12500	4950	Low
214	4320p2x50	64∶27	1∶1	2970.0	50	220	10240	4320	13500	4400	50
215	4320p2x	64∶27	1∶1	2970.0	60	270	10240	4320	11000	4400	60
216	4320p2x100	64∶27	1∶1	5940.0	100	450	10240	4320	13200	4500	100
217	4320p2x120	64∶27	1∶1	5940.0	119.88/120	540	10240	4320	11000	4500	120
218	2160p100	256∶135	1∶1	1188.0	100	225	4096	2160	5280	2250	100
219	2160p120	256∶135	1∶1	1188.0	119.88/120	270	4096	2160	4400	2250	120

Notes: Parentheses indicate instances where pixels are repeated to meet the minimum speed requirements of the interface. For example, in the 720x240p case, the pixels on each line are double-clocked. In the (2880)x480i case, the number of pixels on each line, and thus the number of times that they are repeated, is variable, and is sent to the DTV monitor by the source device.

Increased Hactive expressions include “2x” and “4x” indicate two and four times the reference resolution, respectively.

Video modes with vertical refresh frequency being a multiple of 6 Hz (i.e. 24, 30, 60, 120, and 240 Hz) are considered to be the same timing as equivalent NTSC modes where vertical refresh is adjusted by a factor of 1000/1001. As VESA DMT specifies 0.5% pixel clock tolerance, which 5 times more than the required change, pixel clocks can be adjusted to maintain NTSC compatibility; typically, 240p, 480p, and 480i modes are adjusted, while 576p, 576i and HDTV formats are not.

- The EIA/CEA-861 and 861-A standards included only numbers 1–7 and numbers 17–22 (only in -A) above (but not as short video descriptors which were introduced in EIA/CEA-861-B) and are considered primary video format timings.
- The EIA/CEA-861-B standard has the first 34 short video descriptors above. It is used by HDMI 1.0–1.2a.
- The EIA/CEA-861-C and -D standards have the first 59 short video descriptors above. EIA/CEA-861-D is used by HDMI 1.3–1.3c.
- The EIA/CEA-861-E standard has the first 64 short video descriptors above. It is used by HDMI 1.4–1.4b.
- The CTA-861-F standard has the first 107 short video descriptors above. It is used by HDMI 2.0–2.0b.
- The CTA-861-G standard has the full list of 154 (1–127, 193–219) short video descriptors above. It is used by HDMI 2.1.

==== Audio Data Blocks ====
The Audio Data Blocks contain one or more 3-byte Short Audio Descriptors (SADs). Each SAD details audio format, channel number, and bitrate/resolution capabilities of the display as follows:

Short Audio Descriptor
Byte	Description	
0	Data block header	
1	Format and number of channels:	
1	Bit 7	Reserved, 0
1	Bit 6–3	Audio format code: 0000 0: reserved; 0001 1: Linear pulse-code modulation (LPCM); 0010 2: Dolby Digital (AC-3); 0011 3: MPEG-1 (Layers 1 and 2); 0100 4: MP3; 0101 5: MPEG-2; 0110 6: AAC LC; 0111 7: DTS; 1000 8: ATRAC; 1001 9: One-Bit Audio (DSD), Super Audio CD; 1010 10: Dolby Digital Plus (Enhanced AC-3); 1011 11: DTS-HD or DTS:X; 1100 12: Dolby TrueHD or Dolby Atmos (Dolby MAT/MLP); 1101 13: DST Audio; 1110 14: Microsoft WMA Pro; 1111 15: Extension, see Byte 3
1	Bit 2–0	Number of channels minus 1: 000 1 channel; 001 2 channels; 010 3 channels; 011 4 channels; 100 5 channels; 101 6 channels; 110 7 channels; 111 8 channels
2	Sampling frequencies (kHz) supported:	
2	Bit 7	Reserved, 0
2	Bit 6	192
2	Bit 5	176
2	Bit 4	96
2	Bit 3	88
2	Bit 2	48
2	Bit 1	44.1
2	Bit 0	32
3	Bitrate / format code dependent:	
3	For codec 1, LPCM:	
3	Bits 7–3	Reserved
3	Bit 2	24-bit depth
3	Bit 1	20-bit depth
3	Bit 0	16-bit depth
3	For audio format codecs 2–8, the maximum supported bitrate in bit/s, divided by 8000.	
3	For audio format codecs 9–14, format code dependent value.	
3	For audio format codec 15 (Extension):	
3	Bit 7–3	Audio format extended code: 00000 0: reserved; 00001 1: Not used; 00010 2: Not used; 00011 3: Not used; 00100 4: MPEG-4 HE AAC; 00101 5: MPEG-4 HE AAC v2; 00110 6: MPEG-4 AAC LC; 00111 7: DRA; 01000 8: MPEG-4 HE AAC + MPEG Surround; 01001 9: reserved; 01010 10: MPEG-4 HE AAC LC + MPEG Surround; 01011 11: MPEG-H 3D Audio; 01100 12: AC-4; 01101 13: Linear pulse-code modulation (LPCM 3D Audio); 01110 14: Auro-Cx; 01111 15: MPEG-D USAC; else reserved
3	Bits 2–0	format code dependent value

==== Vendor Specific Data Block ====
A Vendor Specific Data Block (if any) contains as its first three bytes the vendor's IEEE 24-bit registration number, least significant byte first. The remainder of the Vendor Specific Data Block is the "data payload", which can be anything the vendor considers worthy of inclusion in this EDID extension block. For example, IEEE registration number 00 0C 03 means this is a "HDMI Licensing, LLC" specific data block (contains HDMI 1.x info), C4 5D D8 means this is a "HDMI Forum" specific data block (contains HDMI 2.x info), 00 D0 46 means this is "Dolby Labs, Inc." (contains Dolby Vision and Dolby Digital info) and 90 84 8b is "HDR10+ Technologies, LLC" (contains HDR10+ info as part of HDMI 2.1 Amendment A1 standard). It starts with a two byte source physical address, least significant byte first. The source physical address provides the CEC physical address for upstream CEC devices. HDMI 1.3a specifies some requirements for the data payload.

Vendor Specific Data Block for "HDMI Licensing LLC"
Byte	Description	
0	Data block header	
1–3	IEEE Registration Identifier (little endian)	
4–5	Components of Source Physical Address	
6	(optional) 1, supported; 0, unsupported:	
6	Bit 7	A function that needs info from ACP or ISRC packets
6	Bit 6	16-bit-per-channel deep color (48-bit)
6	Bit 5	12-bit-per-channel deep color (36-bit)
6	Bit 4	10-bit-per-channel deep color (30-bit)
6	Bit 3	4∶4∶4 in deep color modes
6	Bit 2	Reserved, 0
6	Bit 1	Reserved, 0
6	Bit 0	DVI Dual Link Operation
7	(optional) Maximum TMDS frequency. 0, unspecified; else, Max_TMDS_Frequency / 5 MHz	
8	(optional) Latency fields indicators 1, present; 0, absent:	
8	Bit 7	Latency fields
8	Bit 6	Interlaced latency fields. Absent if latency fields are absent.
8	Bits 5–0	Reserved, 0
9	Video latency	optional; if indicated, value = 1 + ms/2 with a max. of 251 meaning 500 ms
10	Audio latency (video delay for progressive sources)	optional; if indicated, value = 1 + ms/2 with a max. of 251 meaning 500 ms
11	Interlaced video latency	optional; if indicated, value = 1 + ms/2 with a max. of 251 meaning 500 ms
12	Interlaced audio latency (video delay for interlaced sources)	optional; if indicated, value = 1 + ms/2 with a max. of 251 meaning 500 ms
13+	Additional bytes may be present, but the HDMI spec. says they shall be 00.	

==== Speaker Allocation Data Block ====
If a Speaker Allocation Data Block is present, it will consist of three bytes. The first and second bytes contain information about which speakers (or speaker pairs) are present in the display device:

Speaker Allocation Data Block
Byte	Description	
0	Data block header	
1	1, present; 0, absent:	
1	Bit 7	Front left/right wide (FLw/FRw)
1	Bit 6	Deprecated, was Rear left/right center (RLC/RRC)
1	Bit 5	Front left/right center (FLc/FRc)
1	Bit 4	Back center (BC)
1	Bit 3	Back left/right (BL/BR)
1	Bit 2	Front center (FC)
1	Bit 1	Low-frequency effects (LFE)
1	Bit 0	Front left/right (FL/FR)
2
2	Bit 7	Deprecated, was Top side left/right (TpSiL/TpSiR)
2	Bit 6	Deprecated, was Side left/right (SiL/SiR)
2	Bit 5	Deprecated, was Top back center (TpBC)
2	Bit 4	Deprecated, was Low-frequency effects 2 (LFE2)
2	Bit 3	Left surround/right surround (LS/RS)
2	Bit 2	Top front center (TpFC)
2	Bit 1	Top center (TpC)
2	Bit 0	Top front left/right (TpFL/TpFR)
3	Bits 7-3	Reserved, 0
3	Bit 2	Deprecated, was Bottom front left/right (BtFL/BtFR)
3	Bit 1	Deprecated, was Bottom front center (BtFC)
3	Bit 0	Deprecated, was Top back left/right (TpBL/TpBR)

Some speaker flags have been deprecated in the SADB, but are still available in the RCDB's SPM. These speakers could not be indicated with a CA value in the Audio InfoFrame, and can only be used with Delivery According to the Speaker Mask, which corresponds to the RCDB only.

==== Room Configuration Data Block ====
The Room Configuration Data Block and Speaker Location Data Blocks describe the speaker setup using room coordinates.

Room Configuration Data Block
Byte	Description	
0	Data block header	
0	Bits 7-5	111=7, block type tag
0	Bits 4-0	Length of payload data that follows this block, in bytes
1	13 = extended tag code	
3	Configuration	
3	Bit 7	Display data is valid
3	Bit 6	Speaker count is valid
3	Bit 5	Speaker location descriptors (SLD) are present
3	Bits 4-0	Speaker count (1-32)
4	Speaker presence mask 1 (SPM1): 1, present; 0, absent	
4	Bit 7	Front left/right wide (FLw/FRw)
4	Bit 6	Deprecated, was Rear left/right center (RLC/RRC)
4	Bit 5	Front left/right center (FLc/FRc)
4	Bit 4	Back center (BC)
4	Bit 3	Back left/right (BL/BR)
4	Bit 2	Front center (FC)
4	Bit 1	Low-frequency effects 1 (LFE1)
4	Bit 0	Front left/right (FL/FR)
5	Speaker presence mask 2 (SPM2): 1, present; 0, absent	
5	Bit 7	Top side left/right (TpSiL/TpSiR)
5	Bit 6	Side left/right (SiL/SiR)
5	Bit 5	Top back center (TpBC)
5	Bit 4	Low-frequency effects 2 (LFE2)
5	Bit 3	Left/right surround (LS/RS)
5	Bit 2	Top front center (TpFC)
5	Bit 1	Top center (TpC)
5	Bit 0	Top front left/right (TpFL/TpFR)
6	Speaker presence mask 3 (SPM3): 1, present; 0, absent	
6	Bits 7-4	Reserved, 0
6	Bit 3	Deprecated, was Top left/right surround (TpLS/TpRS)
6	Bit 2	Bottom front left/right (BtFL/BtFR)
6	Bit 1	Bottom front center (BtFC)
6	Bit 0	Top back left/right (TpBL/TpBR)
7-9	Maximum distance from the primary listening position to the farthest speakers along X, Y, Z axes, if speaker location descriptors (SLD) blocks are present; otherwise 00 = undefined	
10-13	Distance from the primary listening position to the center of display along X, Y, Z axes; 00 = undefined when display data flag is not set	
