= DisplayID =

VESA standard for metadata

DisplayID is a VESA standard for metadata describing display device capabilities to the video source. It is designed to replace E-EDID standard.

The DisplayID standard was initially released in December 2007. Version 1.1 was released in March 2009 and was followed by version 1.2 released in August 2011. Version 1.3 was released in June 2013, version 2.0 was released in September 2017. Current version of the standard is 2.1a, released in March 2024.

DisplayID uses variable-length structures of up to 256 bytes each, which encompass all existing EDID extensions as well as new extensions for 3D displays, embedded displays, Wide Color Gamut and HDR EOTF. DisplayID format includes several blocks which describe logical parts of the display such as video interfaces, display device technology, timing details and manufacturer information. Data blocks are identified with a unique tag. The length of each block can be variable or fixed to a specific number of bytes. Only the base data block is mandatory, while all extension blocks are optional. This variable structure is based on CEA EDID Extension Block Version 3 first defined in CEA-861-B.

The DisplayID standard is freely available and is royalty-free to implement.

== DisplayID 2.0 structures ==
Version 2.0 introduces new generalized information blocks primarily intended for UltraHD High Dynamic Range (HDR) displays, such as LCD computer monitors and LCD/OLED televisions with native support for BT.2100 color space and PQ/HLG transfer functions. It also makes optional predefined CRT/LCD timings from DMT and CEA-861 standards, switching to formula-based structures which follow VESA CVT-RB and GTF.

The base DisplayID 2.0 variable-length structure is the same for all data blocks:

Variable-length DisplayID section structure, version 2.0
Byte offset	Value	Mandatory	Description
0	0x20	✓	DisplayID Version 2, Revision 0
1	0–251	✓	Length of the variable data block
2	0–15	✓	Display primary use case (reserved in the extension sections): 0 = Extension section – same use case as the Base section 1 = Test structure (generated by testing equipment); 2 = Generic; 3 = Television; 4 = Productivity; 5 = Gaming; 6 = Presentation; 7 = Virtual reality 8 = Augmented reality
3		✓	Extension count (reserved in the extension sections)
4	Data blocks (N bytes)		
(N+4)		✓	Checksum

Each data block starts with mandatory block tag, revision number (0-7), and payload length (0-248) bytes, and has a variable length of up to 251 bytes. The following blocks are currently defined:

Data block types
Block tag	Mandatory	Name	Notes
0x00–0x1F		Reserved (legacy 1.0 data blocks)	
0x20	✓	Product Identification	
0x21	✓	Display Parameters	Per primary use case
0x22	✓	Type VII – Detailed timing	Per primary use case
0x23		Type VIII – Enumerated Timing Code	
0x24		Type IX – Formula-based Timing	
0x25		Dynamic video timing range Limits	
0x26	✓	Display Interface Features	Per primary use case
0x27		Stereo Display Interface	
0x28		Tiled Display Topology	
0x29		ContainerID	For multi-function devices
0x7E		Vendor specific	
0x81		CTA DisplayID	

=== 0x20 Product identification ===
0x20 Product identification block contains standard vendor and product IDs, serial number, date of manufacture and product name.

Comparing to legacy block 0x00, Microsoft ISA Plug&Play identifier is replaced with IEEE OUI, first used in the network MAC address.

Product Identification block
Byte offset	Bit/value	Description/format
0	0x20	Product Identification block tag
1	0	Revision
2	12–248	Number of payload bytes
3–5		Manufacturer/Vendor ID; IEEE Organizationally Unique Identifier (OUI)
6–7		Product ID, LSB/MSB
8–11		Serial number, optional
12	0–51, 255	Week of Manufacture (0=unspecified); Model year tag (255)
13	0, 15–255	Year of Manufacture/Model Year (0=unspecified); Stored Value = (Year-2000)
14	1–236	Length of product name string
15–251		Product name string, optional

=== 0x21 Display parameters ===
0x21 Display parameters block contains basic parameters such as viewable area size and pixel count, supported color depth, and factory calibrated RGB color space, white point, luminance, and gamma transfer function.

Comparing to legacy block 0x01, color calibration values have been moved here from block 0x02 and max/min luminance values have been added. Display size can be specified in 1 mm increments in addition to default 0.1 mm.

Display Parameters block
Byte offset	Bit/value	Description/format
0	0x21	Display parameters block tag
1	Bits 2:0 = 0	Revision
1	Bit 7	Image size precision: 0 = 0.1 mm (default); 1 = 1 mm
2	29	Number of payload bytes
3–4		Horizontal image size
5–6		Vertical image size
7–8		Horizontal pixel count
9–10		Vertical pixel count
11	Feature-support flags	
11	Bits 2:0	Scan orientation: 0 = Left–right, top–bottom (default); 1 = Right–left, top–bottom 2 = Top–bottom, right–left 3 = Bottom–top, right–left 4 = Right–left, bottom–top 5 = Left–right, bottom–top 6 = Bottom–top, left–right 7 = Top–bottom, left–right
11	Bits 4:3	Max luminance information: 0 = non-zero values are a guaranteed minimum 1 = non-zero values are a guidance for the source device
11	Bit 6	Color-space information: 0 = uses CIE 1931 (x,y) coordinates (default); 1 = uses CIE 1976 (u',v') coordinates
11	Bit 7	Audio speakers information: 0 = integrated (default); 1 = external jack
12–14	Primary Color 1 Chromaticity	
12–14	Bits 7:0	x/u' value, 8-bit LSB
12–14	Bits 11:8	x/u' value, 4-bit MSB
12–14	Bits 15:12	y/v' value, 4-bit LSB
12–14	Bits 23:16	y/v' value, 8-bit MSB
15–17		Primary color 2 chromaticity
18–20		Primary color 3 chromaticity
21–23		White point chromaticity
24–25		Max luminance (full coverage), cd/m^{2}
26–27		Max luminance (10% coverage), cd/m^{2}
28–29		Min luminance, cd/m^{2}
30	Color-depth, display-technology flags	
30	Bits 2:0	Color Depth: 0 = not defined 1 = 6 bpc 2 = 8 bpc 3 = 10 bpc 4 = 12 bpc 5 = 16 bpc
30	Bits 6:4	Display technology: 0 = not specified 1 = AMLCD; 2 = AMOLED
31		Gamma EOTF (1.00–3.54), stored value = (Gamma × 100) – 100 = (Gamma – 1) × 100 (255=unspecified)
Notes: Chromaticity values use 12-bit fractional integer numbers (bit_{12} × 2^{−1} + ... + bit_{0} × 2^{−12}) Luminance values use 16-bit IEEE 754-2008 half-precision floating-point format (−0 = not used)

=== 0x22 Type VII detailed timings ===
0x22 Detailed timing block type VII defines CTA-861 compatible timings based on pixel rate. This block is based on type VI block 0x13.

Type VII – Detailed timing block header
Byte offset	Bit/value	Description/format
0	0x22	Detailed timing block tag
1	Bits 2:0	Revision: 0, 1
1	Bit 2	DSC support 0 = Standard descriptor 1 = Descriptors with DSC pass-through (block revision 1)
2	20–240	Number of payload bytes (N × 20, 1 ≤ N ≤ 12)

Type VII Detailed timing descriptor
Byte offset	Bit/value	Description/format
0–2	Pixel Clock, kHz (0.001–16,777.216 MPix/s)	
0–2	Bits 7:0	8-bit LSB
0–2	Bits 15:8	8-bit middle bits
0–2	Bits 23:16	8-bit MSB
3	Timing options	
3	Bits 3:0	Aspect ratio: 0 = 1:1; 1 = 5:4; 2 = 4:3; 3 = 15:9; 4 = 16:9; 5 = 16:10; 6 = 64:27; 7 = 256:135; 8 = Calculate using horizontal/vertical active image pixels/lines (bytes 4-5 and 12–13)
3	Bit 4	Frame scanning type: 0 = progressive 1 = interlaced
3	Bits 6:5	Stereoscopic 3D: 0 = mono timing 1 = 3D stereo timing 2 = mono or 3D stereo depending on user action
3	Bit 7	Preferred timing: 1 = preferred detailed timing
4–5		Horizontal active image pixels
6–7		Horizontal blank pixels
8–9	Horizontal offset (front porch)	
8–9	Bits 7:0	8-bit LSB
8–9	Bits 14:8	7-bit MSB
8–9	Bit 15	Horizontal sync polarity: 0 = negative 1 = positive
10–11		Horizontal sync width
12–13		Vertical active image lines
14–15		Vertical blank lines
16–17	Vertical sync offset (front porch)	
16–17	Bits 7:0	8-bit LSB
16–17	Bits 14:8	7-bit MSB
16–17	Bit 15	Vertical sync polarity: 0 = negative 1 = positive
18–19		Vertical Sync Width

=== 0x23 Type VIII enumerated timing code ===
0x23 Type VIII enumerated timing code block is based on type IV DMT ID block 0x06. It provides one-byte or two-byte video mode codes as defined in VESA Display Monitor Timings standard or Video Information Codes defined by CTA-861 and HDMI.

Type VIII – Enumerated timing code header
Byte offset	Bit/value	Description/format
0	0x23	Enumerated timing code block tag
1	Bits 2:0 = 0	Revision
1	Bit 3	Timing code size: 0 = one-byte descriptor 1 = two-byte descriptor
1	Bits 7:6	Timing code type: 0 = DMT; 1 = CTA VIC code 2 = HDMI VIC code
2	1–248	Number of payload bytes

=== 0x24 Type IX formula-based timings ===
0x24 Type IX formula-based timings block is based on type V short timings block 0x11.

Type IX – Formula-based timing header
Byte offset	Bit/value	Description/format
0	0x24	Formula-based timing block tag
1	Bits 2:0 = 0	Revision
2	6–248	Number of payload bytes (N × 6)

Type IX Formula-based timing descriptor
Byte offset	Bit/value	Description/format
0	Timing options	
0	Bits 2:0	Timing Formula/Algorithm 0 = CVT; 1 = CVT-RB; 2 = CVT-R2
0	Bit 3	NTSC Video optimized refresh rate × (1000/1001): 0 = not supported 1 = supported
0	Bits 6:5	Stereoscopic 3D: 0 = Mono timing 1 = 3D stereo timing 2 = Mono or 3D stereo depending on user action
1–2		Horizontal active image pixels
3–4		Vertical active image lines
5		vertical refresh rate, Hz (1-256)

=== 0x25 Dynamic video timing range ===
0x25 Dynamic video timing range block is based on block 0x9h Video Timing Range Limits; the new version allows more precise definition of pixel rate in 1 kHz steps and adds indication for variable refresh rates.

Dynamic video timing range block
Byte offset	Bit/value	Description/format
0	0x25	Dynamic video timing range block tag
1	Bits 2:0	Revision: 0, 1
2	9	Number of payload bytes
3–5		Minimum pixel clock, kHz
6–8		Maximum pixel clock, kHz
9		Minimum vertical refresh rate, Hz
10		Maximum vertical refresh rate LSB, Hz
11	Dynamic video timing range Support Flags	
11	Bits 1:0	Maximum vertical refresh rate MSB, Hz (block revision 1)
11	Bit 7	Seamless dynamic video timing change: 0 = not supported 1 = supported with fixed horizontal pixel rate and dynamic vertical blanking

=== 0x26 Display interface features ===
0x26 Display interface features block describes color depth, dynamic range, and transfer function supported by the display controller. It is based on blocks 0x0F display interface features and 0x02 color characteristics.

Display Interface Features block
Byte offset	Bit/value	Description/format
0	0x26	Display interface features block tag
1	Bits 2:0 = 0	Revision
2	9	Number of payload bytes
3	Color-depth support, RGB encoding	
3	Bit 0	6 bpc
3	Bit 1	8 bpc
3	Bit 2	10 bpc
3	Bit 3	12 bpc
3	Bit 4	14 bpc
3	Bit 5	16 bpc
3	0 = no support 1 = supported	
4	Color-depth support, YC_{b}C_{r} 4:4:4 encoding	
5	Color-depth support, YC_{b}C_{r} 4:2:2 encoding	
5	Bit 0	8 bpc
5	Bit 1	10 bpc
5	Bit 2	12 bpc
5	Bit 3	14 bpc
5	Bit 4	16 bpc
5	0 = no support 1 = supported	
6	Color-depth support, YC_{b}C_{r} 4:2:0 encoding	
7	Minimum pixel rate for YCbCr 4:2:0 encoding, pixel rate = 74.25 MP/s × Stored Value (0=supported at all modes)	
8	Audio capability and feature support flags	
8	Bit 5	48 kHz sample rate
8	Bit 6	44.1 kHz sample rate
8	Bit 7	32 kHz sample rate
8	0 = no support 1 = supported	
9	Color space and EOTF combination 1	
9	Bit 0	sRGB (IEC 61966-2-1) Color space and EOTF
9	Bit 1	ITU-R BT.601 Color space and EOTF
9	Bit 2	ITU-R BT.709 Color space and ITU-R BT.1886 EOTF
9	Bit 3	Adobe RGB Color space and EOTF
9	Bit 4	DCI-P3 (SMPTE RP 431–2) Color space and EOTF
9	Bit 5	ITU-R BT.2020 Color space and EOTF
9	Bit 6	ITU-R BT.2020 Color space and SMPTE ST 2084 EOTF
9	0 = no support 1 = supported	
10	0	Color space and EOTF combination 2: reserved
11	0–7	Number of additional color space and EOTF bytes (N)
11+#N	Additional color space and EOTF byte #N	
11+#N	Bits 3:0	EOTF: 0 = defined by display interface rules 1 = sRGB (IEC 61966-2-1); 2 = ITU-R BT.601; 3 = ITU-R BT.1886 for ITU-R BT.709; 4 = Adobe RGB; 5 = DCI-P3 (SMPTE RP 431–2); 6 = ITU-R BT.2020; 7 = Gamma function (value stored in Display Parameters byte 31); 8 = SMPTE ST 2084; 9 = Hybrid log–gamma 10 = Custom (details defined in another block)
11+#N	Bits 3:0	Color space: 0 = Undefined – follow display interface rules 1 = sRGB (IEC 61966-2-1); 2 = ITU-R BT.601; 3 = ITU-R BT.709; 4 = Adobe RGB; 5 = DCI-P3 (SMPTE RP 431–2); 6 = ITU-R BT.2020; 7 = Custom (details defined in another block)

=== 0x27 Stereo display interface ===
0x27 Stereo display interface block is based on block 0x10and describes stereoscopic 3D/VR modes (i.e. timings codes and stereo frame formats) supported by the display.

Stereo Display Interface block
Byte offset	Bit/value	Description/format
0	0x27	Stereo Display Interface block tag
1	Bits 2:0	Revision: 0, 1
1	Bits 7:6	Stereoscopic 3D Timing: 0 = 0b00 = block applies to all 3D timings 1 = 0b01 = block applies to 3D timings with specified Timing Code (block revision 1); 2 = 0b10 = block applies to all timings in any timing block 3 = 0b11 = block applies to timings with specified Timing Code (block revision 1)
2	(N+2)	Number of payload bytes
3	(N+1)	Number of bytes in Stereo Interface Method block
4		Stereo Interface Method code: 0 = Frame/Field Sequential (N=1); 1 = Side-by-Side (N=1); 2 = Pixel Interleaved (N=8); 3 = Dual Interface (N=1); 4 = Multi-view (N=2); 5 = Stacked Frame (N=1); 255 = Vendor defined (N=0)
5	Stereo Interface Method-specific Parameters (N bytes)	
5+N	3D Timings descriptor 1	
5+N	Bits 4:0	Timing Code number (M1, 1-31)
5+N	Bits 7:6	Timing Code Type: 0 = DMT; 1 = CTA VIC code 2 = HDMI VIC code
(6+N+#M1)	One-byte Timing Code #M1	
(7+N+M1)	3D Timings descriptor 2	
(6+N+M1+#M2)	One-byte Timing Code #M2	
Note: 3D Timings descriptors only exist when byte 1 bit 6 = 1

Stereo Display Interface Method-specific Parameters
N, Bytes	Bit/value	Description/format
1	Method code: 0 = Frame/Field Sequential	
1	Bit 0	Stereo Polarity: 0 = Stereo Sync on left eye image 1 = Stereo Sync on right eye image
1	1 = Side-by-Side	
1	Bit 0	View Identify: 0 = Left half represents left eye image 1 = Left half represents right eye image
8	2 = Pixel Interleaved	
8	Bits 7:0	Interleave pattern – 8x8 bit mask 0 = Pixel position for right eye image 1 = Pixel position for left eye image
1	3 = Dual Interface	
1	Bit 0	Interface Left and Right Polarity: 0 = Interface carries right eye image 1 = Interface carries left eye image
1	Bits 2:1	Mirroring 0 = No mirroring 1 = Left/Right are mirrored 1 = Top/Bottom are mirrored
2	4 = Multi-view	
2		Number of Views
2		View Interleaving Method Code
1	5 = Stacked Frame	
1	Bit 0	View Identity: 0 = Top is left-eye image, bottom is right-eye image

=== 0x28 Tiled display topology ===
0x28 Tiled display topology block describes displays that consist of multiple physical display panels, each driven by a separate video interface. It is based on block 0x12.

Tiled Display Topology block
Byte offset	Bit/value	Description/format
0	0x28	Tiled Display Topology block tag
1	Bits 2:0 = 0	Revision
2	22	Number of payload bytes
3	Tiled Display and Tile Capabilities	
3	Bits 2:0	Tile Behavior when the only tile being transmitted: 0 = None of the following 1 = Display at Tile Location (byte 5); 2 = Scale to fit the display 3 = Clone to other tiles
3	Bits 4:3	Tile Behavior when N tiles (1 < N < Max, N<>2) are being transmitted: 0 = None of the following 1 = Display at Tile Location (byte 5)
3	Bit 6	Tile Bezel Descriptor: 0 = Not available 1 = Available at bytes 11-15
3	Bit 7	Physical Display Enclosure: 0 = Multiple physical enclosures 1 = Single physical enclosure
4–6	Tiled Display Topology and Tile Location	
4	Total Number of Tiles	
4	Bits 3:0	Number of Vertical Tiles, 4-bit LSB
4	Bits 7:4	Number of Horizontal Tiles, 4-bit LSB
5	Tile Location	
5	Bits 3:0	Vertical Tile Location, 4-bit LSB
5	Bits 7:4	Horizontal Tile Location, 4-bit LSB
6	Tile Location and Total Number of Tiles	
6	Bits 1:0	Vertical Tile Location, 2-bit MSB
6	Bits 3:2	Horizontal Tile Location, 2-bit MSB
6	Bits 5:4	Number of Vertical Tiles, 2-bit MSB
6	Bits 7:6	Number of Horizontal Tiles, 2-bit MSB
7–10	Tile Size	
7–10	Bits 7:0	Horizontal Size, 8-bit LSB
7–10	Bits 15:8	Horizontal Size, 8-bit MSB
7–10	Bits 23:16	Vertical Size, 8-bit LSB
7–10	Bits 31:24	Vertical Size, 8-bit MSB
11–15	Tile Pixel Multiplier and Tile Bezel-related Information	
11		Tile Pixel Multiplier
12		Tile Top Bezel Size
13		Tile Bottom Bezel Size
14		Tile Right Bezel Size
15		Tile Left Bezel Size
Note: Tile Bezel in pixels = (Tile Pixel Multiplier × Tile Bezel Size × 0.1)
16–24	Tiled Display Topology ID	
16–18		Tiled Display Manufacturer/Vendor ID; IEEE Organizationally Unique Identifier (OUI)
19–20		Tiled Display Product ID LSB/MSB
21–24		Serial number, optional

=== 0x29 Container ID ===
0x29 Container ID block defines a unique identifier used to associate additional devices that may be present in a multifunctional display.

ContainerID block
Byte offset	Bit/value	Description/format
0	0x29	ContainerID block tag
1	Bits 2:0 = 0	Revision
2	16	Number of payload bytes
3–18	Bits 128:0	ContainerID Universally Unique Identifier (UUID)

=== 0x7E Vendor-specific data ===
0x7E Vendor-specific data includes proprietary parameters which are not supported by DisplayID 2.0 structures.

Vendor-specific data block
Byte offset	Bit/value	Description/format
0	0x7E	Vendor-specific block tag
1	Bits 2:0	Revision
2	3–248	Number of payload bytes
3–5		Manufacturer/Vendor ID; IEEE Organizationally Unique Identifier (OUI)
6–224		Payload bytes

VESA Vendor-specific data block
Byte offset	Bit/value	Description/format
0	0x7E	Vendor-specific block tag
1	Bits 2:0 = 1	Revision
2–4	0x3A0292	VESA OUI
5	Bits 2:0	Structure type: 0 = Embedded DisplayPort (eDP); 1 = External DisplayPort
5	Bit 7	Default Color space and EOTF handling: 0 = interpret "RGB unspecified color space" as sRGB Color space and EOTF; 1 = interpret as "native" color space, EOTF is specified in the Display Parameters block 0x21
6	Bits 3:0	Number of horizontal pixels overlapping an adjacent panel segment: 0-8
6	Bits 6:5	Multi-SST operation: 0 = 0b00 = not supported (Conventional Single-Stream Transport); 1 = 0b01 = two streams (two or four links); 2 = 0b10 = four streams (four links)
7	Bits 5:0	Pass-through timing, integer target DSC bpp (bits per pixel)
8	Bits 3:0	Pass-through timing, fractional target DSC bpp (bits per pixel)

=== 0x81 CTA DisplayID ===
0x81 CTA DisplayID block provides information on CTA-861 EDID timings.

CTA DisplayID block header
Byte offset	Bit/value	Description/format
0	0x81	CTA DisplayID block tag
1	Bits 2:0 = 0	Revision
2	3–248	Number of payload bytes
3	CTA Block 1 Tag Code and Block 1 Length	
3	Bits 4:0	Block 1 Length (L1)
3	Bits 7:5	Tag code (CTA-861-G)
4-L1	CTA Block 1 Descriptor #L1	
(L1+2)		CTA Block 2 Tag Code and Block 2 Length

== DisplayID 1.3 structures ==
Version 1.3 information blocks 0x10-0x1F borrow heavily from EDID 1.4 standard, which was designed for previous generation CRT/LCD/DLP/PDP displays.

Variable-length DisplayID section structure, version 1.3
Byte offset	Value	Mandatory	Description
0	0x12	✓	DisplayID Version 1, Revision 3
2	0–15	✓	Display Type Identifier: 0 = Extension section – same use case as the Base section 1 = Test structure (generated by testing equipment); 2 = Display panel 3 = Monitor; 4 = Television; 5 = Repeater; 6 = Direct-drive monitor

The following block types are defined:

Data block types
Block tag	Name
0x00	Product identification
0x01	Display parameters
0x02	Color characteristics
0x03	Type I timing – detailed
0x04	Type II timing – detailed
0x05	Type III timing – short
0x06	Type IV timing – DMT ID code
0x07	VESA timing standard
0x08	CEA Timing Standard
0x09	Video timing range
0x0A	Product serial number
0x0B	General-purpose ASCII string
0x0C	Display device data
0x0D	Interface power sequencing
0x0E	Transfer characteristics
0x0F	Display interface data
0x10	Stereo display interface
0x11	Type V timing – short
0x13	Type VI timing – detailed
0x7F	Vendor specific

Note: where indicated, only the difference from similar/superseding structures in Version 2.0 are shown in the sections below.

=== 0x00 Product identification ===
0x00 Product identification – superseded by 0x20. The difference is:

Product Identification block
Byte offset	Bit/value	Description/format
0	0x00	Product identification block tag
3–5		Manufacturer/vendor ID; Microsoft ISA Plug&Play ID (PnPID)

=== 0x01 Display parameters ===
0x01 Display parameters – superseded by 0x21. The differences are:

Display Parameters block
Byte offset	Bit/value	Description/format
0	0x01	Display parameters block tag
11	Feature-support flags	
11	Bit 0	Deinterlacing
11	Bit 1	Support_AI in ACP/ISRC packets
11	Bit 2	Single fixed pixel format only
11	Bit 3	Single fixed timing only
11	Bit 4	VESA display power management
11	Bit 5	Audio input override
11	Bit 6	Separate audio inputs
11	Bit 7	Audio support
11	0 = no support/no 1 = supported/yes	
12		Transfer characteristic gamma EOTF (1.00–3.54), stored value = (Gamma × 100) – 100 = (Gamma – 1) × 100 (255=unspecified)
13		Aspect ratio = long axis / short axis (1.00–3.55), stored value = (AR – 1) × 100 (78 for 16:9)
14	Color bit depth	
14	Bits 3:0	Panel native dynamic range, stored value = bpc – 1
14	Bits 7:4	Display device overall dynamic range, stored value = bpc – 1

=== 0x02 Color characteristics ===
0x02 Color characteristics – superseded by 0x21 Display parameters.

Color characteristics block
Byte offset	Bit/value	Description/format
0	0x02	Color characteristics block tag
1	Bits 2:0 = 1	Revision
1	Bits 6:3	Transfer characteristic block number (block 0x0E)
1	Bit 7	Color space information: 0 = uses CIE 1931 (x,y) coordinates (default); 1 = uses CIE 1976 (u',v') coordinates
2	(N_{p} + N_{w}) × 3 [ + 1 ]	Number of payload bytes; add 1 if N_{p}=0
3	Color characteristics information	
3	Bits 3:0	Number of white points (N_{w})
3	Bits 6:4	Number of primaries (N_{p}) (0=Standard color space, additional Identifier byte is added to the block payload)
3	Bit 7	Color mode: 0 = Spatial – separate subpixels for each primary color 1 = Temporal – field-sequential color (DLP)
4–6	Color primary or white point chromaticity	
4–6	Bits 7:0	x/u' value, 8-bit LSB, or Standard color space identifier code if N_{p}=0: 0 = sRGB (IEC 61966-2-1); 1 = ITU-R BT.601; 2 = ITU-R BT.709; 3 = Adobe RGB; 4 = DCI-P3 (SMPTE RP 431–2); 5 = NTSC "SMPTE C" (SMPTE RP 145); 6 = PAL (ITU-R BT.470); 7 = Adobe Wide Gamut RGB; 8 = DICOM (PS3.14 Grayscale standard display function)
4–6	Bits 11:8	x/u' value, 4-bit MSB
4–6	Bits 15:12	y/v' value, 4-bit LSB
4–6	Bits 23:16	y/v' value, 8-bit MSB
Notes: Chromaticity values use 12-bit fractional integer numbers (bit_{12} × 2^{−1} + ... + bit_{0} × 2^{−12})

=== 0x03 Type I detailed timings ===
0x03 Type I detailed timings – superseded by 0x22 type VII detailed timings. The differences are:

Type I – Detailed timing block header
Byte offset	Bit/value	Description/format
0	0x03	Detailed timing block tag
1	Bits 2:0 = 1	Revision

Type I Detailed timing descriptor
Byte offset	Bit/value	Description/format
0–2	Pixel clock, 10 kHz steps (0.01–167,772.16 MPix/s)	
3	Timing options	
3	Bits 3:0	Aspect ratio: 8 = Not defined

=== 0x04 Type II detailed timings ===
0x04 Type II detailed timings block provides a compressed structure with less precise pixel coordinates and reduced blank intervals comparing to Type I:

Type II – Detailed timing block header
Byte offset	Bit/value	Description/format
0	0x04	Detailed timing block tag
1	Bits 2:0 = 0	Revision
2	11–242	Number of payload bytes (N × 11, 1 ≤ N ≤ 22)

Type II Detailed timing descriptor
Byte offset	Bit/value	Description/format
0–2	Pixel clock, 10 kHz steps (0.01–167,772.16 MPix/s)	
3	Timing options	
3	Bit 2	Vertical sync polarity: 0 = negative 1 = positive
3	Bit 3	Horizontal sync polarity: 0 = negative 1 = positive
4		Horizontal active image pixels, 8-bit LSB
5	Bits 7:1	Horizontal blank pixels
5	Bit 0	Horizontal active image pixels, 1-bit MSB
6	Horizontal sync offset (front porch) and width	
6	Bits 3:0	Sync offset (front porch)
6	Bits 7:4	Sync width
7		Vertical active image lines, 8-bit LSB
8	Bits 4:0	Vertical active image pixels, 4-bit MSB
9		Vertical blank lines
10	Vertical sync offset (front porch) and width	
10	Bits 3:0	Sync offset (front porch)
10	Bits 7:4	Sync width
10	Note: For all pixel dimensions, stored value = (Pixels / 8) – 1	

=== 0x05 Type III short timings ===
0x05 Type III short timings block provides a very short compressed structure which uses formula-based CVT timings.

Type III – Short timing block header
Byte offset	Bit/value	Description/format
0	0x05	Short timing block tag
1	Bits 2:0 = 1	Revision
2	6–248	Number of payload bytes (N × 3, 1 ≤ N ≤ 82)

Type III short timing descriptor
Byte offset	Bit/value	Description/format
0	Timing options	
0	Bits 6:4	Timing formula/algorithm 0 = CVT; 1 = CVT-RB
0	Bits 3:0	Aspect ratio
1		Horizontal active image pixels
2	Frame transfer type and rate	
2	Bit 7	Frame transfer type: 0 = progressive 1 = field interlaced
2	Note: For all pixel dimensions, stored value = (Pixels / 8) – 1	

=== 0x06 Type IV short timings ===
0x06 Type IV short timing (DMT ID code) block uses video mode codes defined in VESA display monitor timings standard, as well as video information codes defined by CTA-861 and HDMI. Superseded by 0x23 enumerated timing.

Type IV – Short timing DMT ID code header
Byte offset	Bit/value	Description/format
0	0x06	Type IV – Short timing (DMT ID code) block tag
1	Bits 2:0 = 1	Revision
1	Bits 7:6	Timing code type: 0 = DMT; 1 = CTA VIC code 2 = HDMI VIC code
2	1–248	Number of payload bytes

=== 0x11 Type V short timings ===
0x11 Type V short timings block is based on Type III short timings block 0x05, but provides greater pixel precision and only supports CVT-RB. Superseded by 0x24 Type IX formula-based timings.

Type V – Short timing header
Byte offset	Bit/value	Description/format
0	0x11	Type V – Short timing block tag
1	Bits 2:0 = 0	Revision
2	6–248	Number of payload bytes (N × 7, 1 ≤ N ≤ 35)

Type V short timing descriptor
Byte offset	Bit/value	Description/format
0	Timing options	
0	Bits 1:0	Timing formula/algorithm 0 = CVT-RB2; 1 = CVT-RB
0	Bit 4	NTSC Video optimized refresh rate × (1000/1001): 0 = not supported 1 = supported
0	Bits 6:5	Stereoscopic 3D: 0 = Mono timing 1 = 3D stereo timing 2 = Mono or 3D stereo depending on user action
0	Bit 7	Preferred timing: 1 = preferred detailed timing
1–2		Horizontal active image pixels
3–4		Vertical active image lines
5		Vertical Refresh Rate, Hz (1–256)

=== 0x13 Type VI detailed timing ===
0x13 Type VI Detailed timing block supports higher precision pixel clock and high-resolution timings. This block is based on Type I block 0x03, but allows greater timings precision using 1 kHz steps instead of 10 kHz. Superseded by 0x22 Type VII Detailed timings.

Type VI – Detailed timing block header
Byte offset	Bit/value	Description/format
0	0x13	Type VI detailed timing block tag
1	Bits 2:0 = 0	Revision
2		Number of payload bytes (N × 17 + M × 14)

Type VI Detailed timing descriptor
Byte offset	Bit/value	Description/format
0–2	Pixel clock, kHz (0.001–4,194.303 MPix/s)	
0–2	Bits 7:0	8-bit LSB
0–2	Bits 15:8	8-bit middle bits
0–2	Bits 21:16	6-bit MSB
0–2	Bit 22	Aspect and size information: 0 = not included 1 = included in bytes 14–16
0–2	Bit 23	Preferred timing: 0 = not a preferred detailed timing 1 = preferred detailed timing
3–4	Horizontal active image pixels & timing	
3–4	Bits 7:0	Horizontal active image pixels, 8-bit LSB
3–4	Bits 14:8	Horizontal active image pixels, 7-bit MSB
3–4	Bit 16	Horizontal Sync Polarity: 0 = negative 1 = positive
5–6	Vertical active image lines & timing	
5–6	Bits 7:0	Vertical active image lines, 8-bit LSB
5–6	Bits 14:8	Vertical active image lines, 7-bit MSB
5–6	Bit 16	Vertical Sync Polarity: 0 = negative 1 = positive
7–9	Horizontal blank pixels & front porch	
7–9	Bits 7:0	Horizontal blank pixels, 8-bit LSB
7–9	Bits 15:8	Horizontal offset (front porch), 8-bit LSB
7–9	Bits 19:16	Horizontal blank pixels, 4-bit MSB
7–9	Bits 23:20	Horizontal offset (front porch), 4-bit MSB
10		Horizontal Sync Width
11		Vertical Blank Lines
12		Vertical Sync offset (front porch)
13		Vertical Sync Width and Timing
13	Bits 3:0	Vertical Sync Width
13	Bits 6:5	Stereoscopic 3D: 0 = mono timing 1 = 3D stereo timing 2 = mono or 3D stereo depending on user action
13	Bit 7	Frame scanning type: 0 = progressive 1 = interlaced
14		Aspect multiplier, aspect ratio = Aspect Multiplier × 3 / 256
15–16	Vertical image base size and size multiplier	
15–16	Bits 7:0	Vertical image base size, 8-bit LSB
15–16	Bits 11:8	Vertical image base size, 4-bit MSB
15–16	Bits 15:12	Size Multiplier
15–16	Vertical image size = Vertical image base size × Size Multiplier	

=== 0x09 Video timing range limits ===
0x09 Video timing range limits block describes displays capable of variable timings. Superseded by 0x25 Dynamic video timings range.

Video timing range limits block
Byte offset	Bit/value	Description/format
0	0x09	Video timing range limits block tag
1	Bits 2:0 = 0	Revision
2	9	Number of payload bytes
3–5		Minimum pixel clock, 10 kHz steps
6–8		Maximum pixel clock, 10 kHz steps
9		Minimum Horizontal Frequency, kHz
10		Maximum Horizontal Frequency, kHz
11–12		Minimum Horizontal Blanking Pixels
13		Minimum Vertical Refresh Rate, Hz
14		Maximum Vertical Refresh Rate, Hz
15–16		Minimum Vertical Blanking Lines
17	Video timing support flags	
17	Bit 4	Discrete frequency display
17	Bit 5	VESA CVT
17	Bit 6	VESA CVT-RB
17	Bit 7	Interlaced
17	0 = no support/no 1 = supported/yes	

=== 0x0C Display device data ===
0x0C Display device data block provides information about display panel characteristics for embedded applications, such as display technology, panel type, and pixel response times.

Display device data block
Byte offset	Bit/value	Description/format
0	0x0C	Display device data block tag
1	Bits 2:0 = 0	Revision
2	13	Number of payload bytes
3	Display device technology and sub-type codes	
3	Bits 7:0	CRT 0=0x00 = Monochrome CRT; 1=0x01 = Tricolor CRT; 2=0x02 = Other CRT; LCD; 16=0x10 = Passive matrix TN (HTN, STN); 17=0x11 = Passive matrix cholesteric LC; 18=0x12 = Passive matrix ferroelectric LC; 19=0x13 = Other passive matrix LC; 20=0x14 = Active matrix TN; 21=0x15 = Active matrix IPS; 22=0x16 = Active matrix VA; 22=0x16 = Active matrix OCB; 22=0x16 = Active matrix ferroelectric 31=0x1F = Other LC; Plasma display (PDP); 32=0x20 = DC plasma 33=0x21 = AC plasma Other display technology 48=0x30 = Electroluminescent (except OLED/OEL); 64=0x40 = Inorganic LED; 80=0x50 = OLED/OEL; 96=0x60 = FED/SED (cold-cathode, phosphor-based); 112=0x70 = Electrophoretic; 128=0x80 = Electrochromic; 144=0x90 = Electromechanic; 160=0xA0 = Electrowetting; 240=0xF0 = Other
3	Bits 7:4	Display Technology, 4-bit MSB 0 = CRT; 1 = LCD; 2 = PDP; 3 = ELD; 4 = LED; 5 = OLED/OEL; 6 = FED/SED; 7 = Ep; 8 = Ec; 9 = Em; 10=0xA = Ew; 15=0xF = Other
4	Display Device Operating Mode & Flags	
4	Bit 2	Backlight can be switched off
4	Bit 3	Backlight intensity can be controlled
4	0 = no support/no 1 = supported/yes	
4	Bits 7:4	Operating Mode code: 0 = Direct-view reflective, ambient lighting (no illumination); 1 = Direct-view reflective, illuminated, ambient lighting (no illumination) by default 2 = Direct-view reflective, illuminated 3 = Direct-view transmissive, ambient lighting (no illumination); 4 = Direct-view transmissive, illuminated, ambient lighting (no illumination) by default 5 = Direct-view transmissive, illuminated 6 = Direct-view emissive 7 = Direct-view transflective, reflective (backlight off) by default 8 = Direct-view transflective, transmissive (backlight on) by default 9 = Transparent, viewable in ambient light 10 = Transparent emissive 11 = Projection, reflective light modulator (DLP/LCOS); 12 = Projection, transmissive light modulator (LCD projection); 13 = Projection, emissive image transducer (CRT projection)
5–8	Display Device Native Pixel Format	
5–6		Horizontal pixel count
7–8		Vertical pixel count
9–10	Aspect Ratio and Orientation	
9		Aspect Ratio = long axis / short axis (1.00–3.55), stored value = (AR – 1) × 100 (78 for 16:9)
10	Orientation	
10	Bits 1:0	Scan direction: 0 = Not defined/no raster scan 1 = Line (fast scan) on long axis, frame/field (slow scan) on short axis 2 = Line (fast scan) on short axis, frame/field (slow scan) on long axis
10	Bits 3:2	Zero pixel location: 0 = Upper left corner 1 = Upper right corner 2 = Lower left corner 3 = Lower right corner
10	Bits 5:4	Rotation capability: 0 = No rotation 1 = Clockwise 90° 2 = Counter-clockwise 90° 2 = 90° in either direction
10	Bits 7:6	Orientation: 0 = Landscape (horizontal long axis); 1 = Portrait (vertical long axis); 2 = Not fixed (can be rotated by user)
11		RGB Sub-pixel Information codes: 0 = Not defined 1 = RGB vertical stripes 2 = RGB horizontal stripes 3 = Vertical stripes, ordered as in Display Chromaticity block 4 = Horizontal stripes, ordered as in Display Chromaticity block 5 = RGGB 2x2 quad structure, red at top left, blue at bottom right 6 = RGGB 2x2 quad structure, red at bottom left, blue at top right 7 = Triad (delta); 8 = Mosaic (delta); 9 = RGBE/RGBW 2x2 quad structure, any order 10 = Five subpixels – RGB vertical and two colors above and below 11 = Six subpixels – RGB vertical and three colors in any order 11 = PenTile
12		Horizontal Pixel Pitch, in 0.01 mm steps (0.01% for projection)
13		Vertical Pixel pitch, in 0.01 mm steps (0.01% for projection)
14	Color Bit Depth	
14	Bits 3:0	Panel native dynamic range, stored value = bpc – 1
15	Response Time	
15	Bits 6:0	Pixel response time, in ms (clamped to 0 and 126)
15	Bit 7	Measurement method: 0 = Black to white (lower to higher) transition 1 = White to black (higher to lower) transition

=== 0x0F Display interface data ===
Display interface features block – superseded by 0x26 Display Interface Features.

Display Interface Data block
Byte offset	Bit/value	Description/format
0	0x0F	Display Interface Features block tag
1	Bits 2:0 = 0	Revision
2	10	Number of payload bytes
3	Interface Type and Number of Links	
3	Bits 3:0	Number of links (1, 2, or 4), or Analog sub-type (if bits 7:4 = 0): 0 = 15HD/VGA (VESA EDDC Standard); 1 = VESA NAVI-V (15HD); 2 = VESA NAVI-D
3	Bits 7:4	Display Interface Type: 0 = Analog; 1 = LVDS (generic); 2 = TMDS (generic); 3 = RSDS (generic); 4 = DVI-D; 5 = DVI-I, analog 6 = DVI-I, digital 7 = HDMI-A; 8 = HDMI-B (dual link); 9 = MDDI; 10 = DisplayPort; 11 = Proprietary digital interface
4	Interface Standard Version and Revision	
4	Bits 3:0	Interface revision
4	Bits 7:4	Interface version
5	Color Depth Support, RGB encoding	
5	Bit 0	6 bpc
5	Bit 1	8 bpc
5	Bit 2	10 bpc
5	Bit 3	12 bpc
5	Bit 4	14 bpc
5	Bit 5	16 bpc
5	0 = no support 1 = supported	
6	Color Depth Support, YC_{b}C_{r} 4:4:4 encoding	
7	Color Depth Support, YC_{b}C_{r} 4:2:2 encoding	
7	Bit 0	8 bpc
7	Bit 1	10 bpc
7	Bit 2	12 bpc
7	Bit 3	14 bpc
7	Bit 4	16 bpc
7	0 = no support 1 = supported	
8	Content Protection support: 0 = No support 1 = HDCP; 2 = DTCP; 3 = DPCP	
9	Content Protection Standard Version and Revision	
9	Bits 3:0	Standard revision
9	Bits 7:4	Standard version
10	Spread Spectrum Information	
10	Bits 3:0	Spread percentage, in 0.1% increments (range 0 to 1.5%)
10	Bits 7:6	Spread type supported: 0 = No support 1 = Down spread 2 = Center spread
11	Interface type dependent attribute 1	
11	Bit 0	3.3 V
11	Bit 1	5 V
11	Bit 2	12 V
11	Bit 3	2.8 V
11	0 = no support 1 = supported	
11	Bit 4	Color mapping: 0 = NS (Normal) mode 1 = 6-bit compatible mode
12	Interface type dependent attribute 2	
12	Bit 0	Shift clock data strobe: 0 = Falling edge 1 = Rising edge
12	Bit 1	DE polarity: 0 = Active high (high signal level); 1 = Active low (low signal level)
12	Bit 2	DE mode : 0 = DE (data enable) mode 1 = Fixed mode (VSync/HSync)

=== Additional blocks ===
Data blocks not described above are:

0x0A Serial number data block provides product serial number as an ASCII string.

0x0B General-purpose ASCII string block provides general purpose text strings that may be required by specific applications.

0xD0 Interface power sequencing block defines display interface signal timings required for entering and exiting sleep mode.

0x0E Transfer characteristics block defines detailed gamma curves according to VESA display transfer characteristic data block (DTCDB) standard, as may be required by byte 1 in 0x02 color characteristics block.

0x10 Stereo display interface block describes stereoscopic 3D/VR modes – superseded by 0x27 Ssereo display interface.

0x12 Tiled display topology data block defines multi-panel displays – superseded by 0x28 tiled display topology.

0x7F Vendor specific block defines proprietary vendor data.

== See also ==
- DisplayPort
