= Blanking (video) =

CRT beam scanning amplitude control

In analog video, blanking occurs between horizontal lines and between frames. In raster scan equipment, an image is built up by scanning an electron beam from left to right across a screen to produce a visible trace of one scan line, reducing the brightness of the beam to zero (horizontal blanking), moving it back as fast as possible to the left of the screen at a slightly lower position (the next scan line), restoring the brightness, and continuing until all the lines have been displayed and the beam is at the bottom right of the screen. Its intensity is then reduced to zero again (vertical blanking), and it is rapidly moved to the top left to start again, creating the next frame.

In television, in particular, the vertical blanking interval is long to accommodate the slow equipment available at the time the standard was set. Fast modern electronics allows digital information to be encoded into the signal during the vertical blanking interval; it is not displayed on screen as the beam is blanked, but can be processed by appropriate circuitry.
