= Digital Packet Video Link =

Communication protocols

Digital Packet Video Link (DPVL) is a video standard released by VESA in 2004. Unlike previous technologies, in order to save bandwidth, only portions of the screen that are modified are sent by the means of this link. DPVL also introduces metadata video attributes support.

The DPVL standard is aimed at mobile and Wireless hardware.
