= Vertical blanking interval =

Time between drawing frames or fields

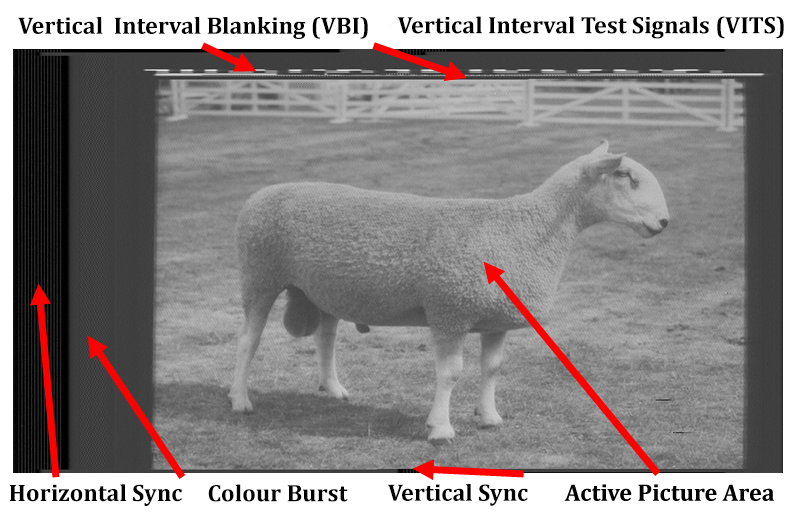
1135×624 4fsc decoded frame (Luma) from a Composite 4fsc decode of a LaserDisc

In a raster scan display, the vertical blanking interval (VBI), also known as the vertical interval or VBLANK, is the time between the end of the final visible line of a frame or field and the beginning of the first visible line of the next frame or field. It is present in analog television, VGA, DVI and other signals. Here the term field is used in interlaced video, and the term frame is used in progressive video and there can be a VBI after each frame or field. In interlaced video a frame is made up of 2 fields. Sometimes in interlaced video a field is called a frame which can lead to confusion.

In raster cathode-ray tube (CRT) displays, the blank level is usually supplied during this period to avoid painting the retrace line—see raster scan for details; signal sources such as television broadcasts do not supply image information during the blanking period. Digital displays usually will not display incoming data stream during the blanking interval even if present.

The VBI was originally needed because of the inductive inertia of the magnetic coils which deflect the electron beam vertically in a CRT; the magnetic field, and hence the position being drawn, cannot change instantly. Additionally, the speed of older circuits was lower than today’s. For horizontal deflection, there is also a pause between successive lines, to allow the beam to return from right to left, called the horizontal blanking interval. Modern CRT circuitry does not require such a long blanking interval, and thin panel displays require none, but the standards were established when the delay was needed (and to allow the continued use of older equipment). Blanking of a CRT may not be perfect due to equipment faults or brightness set very high; in this case a white retrace line shows on the screen, often alternating between fairly steep diagonals from right to left and less-steep diagonals back from left to right, starting in the lower right of the display.

In analog television systems the vertical blanking interval can be used for datacasting (to carry digital data), since nothing sent during the VBI is displayed on the screen; various test signals, VITC timecode, closed captioning, teletext, CGMS-A copy-protection indicators, and various data encoded by the XDS protocol (e.g., the content ratings for V-chip use) and other digital data can be sent during this time period.

In U.S. analog broadcast television, line 19 was reserved for a Ghost-canceling reference and line 21 was reserved for NABTS captioning data. Teletext contemplated the use of line 22 for data transmission.

The pause between sending video data is sometimes used in real time computer graphics to modify the frame buffer, or to provide a time reference for when switching the source buffer for video output can happen without causing a visible tear. This is especially true in video game systems, where the fixed frequency of the blanking period might also be used to derive in-game timing.

On many consoles there is an extended blanking period, as the console opts to paint graphics on fewer lines than the television would natively allow, permitting its output to be surrounded by a border. On some very early machines such as the Atari 2600, the programmer is in full control of video output and therefore may select their own blanking period, allowing arbitrarily few painted lines. On others such as the Nintendo Entertainment System, a predefined blanking period could be extended.

Most consumer VCRs use the known black level of the vertical blanking pulse to set their recording levels. The Macrovision copy protection scheme inserts pulses in the VBI, where the recorder expects a constant level, to disrupt recording to videotapes.

== Vertical blanking interval in digital video ==
While digital video interconnects (such as DVI and HDMI) generally do have a "vertical blanking" part of the datastream, they are unable to carry closed caption text or most of the other items that, in analog TV interconnects, are transmitted during the "vertical blanking interval". This can lead to closed captioning § Digital television interoperability issues.

Some modern monitors and video cards support reduced blanking, standardized with Coordinated Video Timings.

== See also ==
- Vertical blank interrupt
- Datacasting
- Horizontal blanking interval
- Nominal analogue blanking
- Raster scan
