= Coordinated Video Timings =

Video signal standard

Coordinated Video Timings (CVT; VESA-2013-3 v1.2) is a standard by VESA which defines the timings of the component video signal. Initially intended for use by computer monitors and video cards, the standard made its way into consumer televisions.

The parameters defined by standard include horizontal blanking and vertical blanking intervals, horizontal frequency and vertical frequency (collectively, pixel clock rate or video signal bandwidth), and horizontal/vertical sync polarity.

The standard was adopted in 2002 and superseded the Generalized Timing Formula.

== Reduced blanking ==
CVT timings include the necessary pauses in picture data (known as "blanking intervals") to allow CRT displays to reposition their electron beam at the end of each horizontal scan line, as well as the vertical repositioning necessary at the end of each frame. CVT also specifies a mode ("CVT-RB" (Note: The "Reduced Blanking" variant of the standard is never abbreviated to an acronym in the CVT specification, albeit video modes using it have their VESA standard designation appended with "-R". As a result, both "CVT-R" and "CVT-RB" have been used by users of the specification to refer to the first version of Reduced Blanking.)) which significantly reduces these blanking intervals (to a period insufficient for CRT displays to work correctly) in the interests of saving video signal bandwidth when modern displays such as LCD monitors are being used, since such displays typically do not require these pauses in the picture data. This also allows for lower pixel clock rates and higher frame rates.

In revision 1.2, released in 2013, a new "Reduced Blanking Timing Version 2" mode was added which further reduces the horizontal blanking interval from 160 to 80 pixels, increases pixel clock precision from ±0.25 MHz to ±0.001 MHz, and adds the option for a 1000/1001 modifier for ATSC/NTSC video-optimized timing modes (e.g. 59.94 Hz instead of 60.00 Hz or 23.976 Hz instead of 24.000).

CEA-861-H introduced RBv3. RBv3 defines ways to specify different VBLANK and HBLANK duration formulae.

CEA-861-I introduced "Optimized Video Timings" (OVT), a standard timing calculation that covers resolution/refresh rate combinations not supported by CVT.

== Bandwidth ==
Example data rates required by various display resolutions using common timing methods
Video Format	Data Rate (Gbit/s)				
Video Format	CVT	CVT-RB	CVT-RB v2	CVT-RB v3	CTA-861 VIC
1280 × 720 @ 60 Hz	1.79	1.54	1.45	1.44	1.78
1920 × 1080 @ 60 Hz	4.15	3.33	3.20	3.17	3.56
2560 × 1440 @ 60 Hz	7.49	5.80	5.63	5.58	—N/a
3840 × 2160 @ 30 Hz	8.13	6.31	6.18	6.15	7.13
3840 × 2160 @ 60 Hz	17.10	12.80	12.54	12.42	14.26
5120 × 2880 @ 60 Hz	30.64	22.52	22.18	21.97	—N/a
7680 × 4320 @ 30 Hz	33.62	24.72	24.48	24.37	28.51
7680 × 4320 @ 60 Hz	69.42	50.15	49.65	49.18	57.02
Values are calculated for 8 bpc RGB or Y′C_{B}C_{R} 4∶4∶4 color mode. For different color depths, multiply results by 1.25 (for 10 bpc), 1.5 (for 12 bpc), or 2 (for 16 bpc). For chroma subsampled formats, divide results by 1.5 for Y′C_{B}C_{R} 4∶2∶2, or by 2 for Y′C_{B}C_{R} 4∶2∶0.

== See also ==
- Extended display identification data
