= Video Electronics Standards Association =

Technical standards organization for computer displays

- Abbreviation: VESA
- Formation: July 1989 (37 years ago)
- Purpose: Standards organization
- Headquarters: San Jose, California, USA
- Members: See list.
- Website: vesa.org

The Video Electronics Standards Association, abbreviated as VESA (/ˈviːsə/), is an American technical standards organization for computer display standards. The organization was incorporated in California in July 1989 and has its office in San Jose. It claims a membership of over 300 companies.

In November 1988, NEC Home Electronics announced its creation of the association to develop and promote a Super VGA computer display standard as a successor to IBM's proprietary Video Graphics Array (VGA) display standard. Super VGA enabled graphics display resolutions up to 800×600 pixels, compared to VGA's maximum resolution of 640×480 pixels—a 56% increase.

The organization has since issued several additional standards related to computer video displays. Widely used VESA standards include DisplayHDR, DisplayPort, and Flat Display Mounting Interface.

== Standards ==
- Feature connector (VFC), obsolete connector that was often present on older videocards, used as an 8-bit video bus to other devices
- VESA Advanced Feature Connector (VAFC), newer version of the VFC that widens the bus to either a 16-bit or 32-bit bus
- VESA Local Bus (VLB), once used as a fast video bus (akin to the more recent Accelerated Graphics Port (AGP))
- VESA BIOS Extensions (VBE), used for enabling standard support for advanced video modes
- Display Data Channel (DDC), a data link protocol which a host device can use to control an attached display and communicate EDID, DPMS, MCCS and similar messages
- Extended Display Identification Data (EDID), a data format for display identification data
- Monitor Control Command Set (MCCS), a message protocol for controlling display parameters such as brightness, contrast, display orientation from the host device
- DisplayID, display identification data format, which is a replacement for E-EDID
- VESA Display Power Management Signaling (DPMS), which can be used to invoke power saving modes in monitors
- Digital Packet Video Link (DPVL), a display link standard that can be used to update only portions of the screen
- VESA Stereo, a standard 3-pin connector for synchronization of stereoscopic images with LC shutter glasses
- Flat Display Mounting Interface (FDMI)
- Generalized Timing Formula (GTF), video timing standard
- Coordinated Video Timings (CVT), a replacement for GTF
- VESA Video Interface Port (VIP), a digital video interface standard
- DisplayPort (DP), a digital display interface standard
- VESA Enhanced Video Connector, an obsolete standard for reducing the number of cables around computers
- DisplayHDR, a standard to simplify HDR specifications for the display industry and consumers

== History ==
At the time DisplayPort was announced, VESA was criticized for developing the specification in secret and having a track record of developing unsuccessful digital interface standards, including Plug & Display and Digital Flat Panel.

== Members ==
The following major companies are members of VESA.

- AMD – American multinational semiconductor company
- Apple Inc. – American multinational technology company
- Canon Inc. – Japanese multinational imaging corporation
- Casio – Japanese electronics company
- Dell – American multinational technology company
- Dolby Laboratories – Audio technology company
- Foxconn – Taiwanese multinational electronics contract manufacturer
- Fujitsu – Japanese multinational technology company
- Gigabyte Technology – Taiwanese computer hardware company
- Google – American multinational technology company
- HP – American information technology company (1939–2015)
- HTC – Taiwanese electronics company
- Huawei – Chinese multinational technology company
- Ikegami Tsushinki – Japanese TV equipment manufacturer
- Intel Corporation – American multinational technology company
- JVC Kenwood – Japanese multinational electronics company
- Lenovo – Chinese multinational technology company
- LG Electronics – South Korean multinational electronics company
- Maxell – Japanese electronics company
- Microsoft – American multinational technology conglomerate
- NEC – Japanese technology corporation
- Nvidia – American multinational technology company
- Panasonic – Japanese multinational electronics corporation
- Parade Technologies
- Samsung Electronics – South Korean multinational electronics corporation
- Seiko Epson – Japanese multinational electronics company
- Sony – Japanese multinational conglomerate
