= Horizontal blanking interval =

Part of the process of displaying images on a raster scan monitor

Horizontal blanking interval refers to a part of the process of displaying images on a computer monitor or television screen via raster scanning. CRT screens display images by moving beams of electrons very quickly across the screen. Once the beam of the monitor has reached the edge of the screen, it is switched off, and the deflection circuit voltages (or currents) are returned to the values they had for the other edge of the screen; this would have the effect of retracing the screen in the opposite direction, so the beam is turned off during this time. This part of the line display process is the Horizontal Blank.

In detail, the horizontal blanking interval consists of:

- front porch – blank while still moving right, past the end of the scanline,
- sync pulse – blank while rapidly moving left; in terms of amplitude, "blacker than black".
- back porch – blank while moving right again, before the start of the next scanline. The color burst occurs during the back porch, and unblanking happens at the end of the back porch.

In the NTSC television standard, horizontal blanking occupies 10.7 μs out of every 63.6 μs scan line (16.8%). In PAL, it occupies 12 μs out of every 64 μs scan line (18.8%).

Some modern monitors and video cards support reduced blanking, standardized with Coordinated Video Timings.

In the PAL television standard, the blanking level corresponds to the black level, whilst other standards, most notably some variants of NTSC, may set the black level slightly above the blanking level on a pedestal or set up level.

== Effects ==
Some graphics systems can count horizontal blanks and change how the display is generated during this blank time in the signal; this is called a raster effect, of which an example is raster bars.

In video games, the horizontal blanking interval was used to create some notable effects. Some methods of parallax scrolling use a raster effect to simulate depth in consoles that do not natively support multiple background layers or do not support enough background layers to achieve the desired effect. One example of this is in the game Castlevania: Rondo of Blood, which was written for the PC Engine CD-ROM, which does not support multiple background layers. The Super Nintendo Entertainment System's Mode 7 uses the horizontal blanking interval to vary the scaling and rotation, per scan line, of one background layer to make the background appear to be a 3D plane.

== See also ==
- Nominal analogue blanking
- Vertical blanking interval
