= Horizontal scan rate =

Lines transmitted/displayed per second in a raster-scan video system

Horizontal scan rate, or horizontal frequency, usually expressed in kilohertz, is the number of times per second that a raster-scan video system transmits or displays a complete horizontal line, as opposed to vertical scan rate, the number of times per second that an entire screenful of image data is transmitted or displayed.

== Cathode ray tubes ==
Within a cathode-ray tube (CRT), the horizontal scan rate is how many times in a second that the electron beam moves from the left side of the display to the right and back. The number of horizontal lines displayed per second can be roughly derived from this number multiplied by the vertical scan rate.

The horizontal scan frequencies of a CRT include some intervals that occur during the vertical blanking interval, so the horizontal scan rate does not directly correlate to visible display lines unless the quantity of unseen lines are also known.

The horizontal scan rate is one of the primary figures determining the resolution capability of a CRT, since it is determined by how quickly the electromagnetic deflection system can reverse the current flowing in the deflection coil in order to move the electron beam from one side of the display to the other. Reversing the current more quickly requires higher voltages, which require more expensive electrical components.

In analog television systems, the horizontal frequency is between 15.625 kHz and 15.750 kHz.

== Other technologies ==
While other display technologies such as liquid-crystal displays do not have the specific electrical characteristics that constrain horizontal scan rates on CRTs, there is still a horizontal scan rate characteristic in the signals that drive these displays.
