= Dynamic device mapping =

USB KVM switch technology

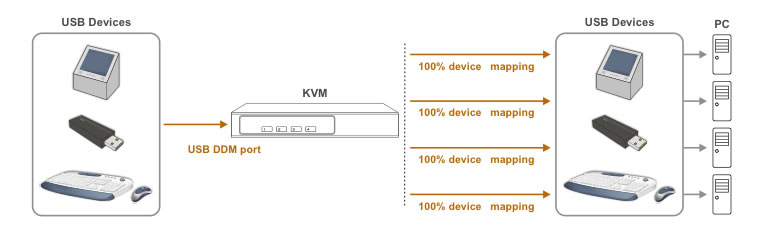
Full Device Mapping

Dynamic device mapping (DDM) is a technology for USB KVM switches which is sometimes implemented as an alternative to standard USB keyboard and mouse emulation.

== Design ==
With DDM technology, the communication between shared peripherals and all connected systems are maintained 100% of the time, even as a user switches between the KVM ports. This makes generic device emulation unnecessary as the DDM allows each connected computer system to believe all connected I/O devices are remaining connected even as the KVM switch might move to another port.

== KVM device emulation ==
Many USB KVM devices provide peripheral emulation, sending signals to the computers that are not currently selected to simulate a keyboard, mouse and monitor being connected. The emulation is used to avoid problems with machines which may reboot in unattended operation. Peripheral emulation services embedded in the hardware also provides continuous support where computers require constant communication with the peripherals. In addition, some types of computer systems do not treat USB devices as hot-pluggable, which means the keyboard and mouse will not be re-detected when switching back to a particular KVM port. For these types of systems, it is necessary to implement device emulation.

Standard device emulation has its limitations. When emulating a USB keyboard, mouse, and monitor it is impossible for most KVM's to simulate various types of I/O devices specifically. As a result, KVM switches will sometimes offer inconsistent performance and even sometimes unsolved compatibility issues with the shared keyboard, mouse, and other devices. The intent of DDM is to resolve the issues that standard device mapping sometimes faces.

== Applications for USB DDM ==
- sharing touchscreen monitor among connected systems
- integrated multi-vendor self-service kiosk systems
- secured user login by sharing USB smart card or biometrics reader (e.g. fingerprint scanner)

== See also ==
- KVM switch
- Display data channel
- Display Control Channel
