= EDDC =

EDDC may refer to:

- Dresden Airport (by its ICAO code)
- East Devon District Council in the United Kingdom
- East Dorset District Council in the United Kingdom
- Enhanced Display Data Channel (E-DDC)
