= RGU =

RGU may refer to:

- Rajiv Gandhi University, India
- Remote graphics unit, a computer control device
- Revolutionary Girl Utena, Japanese anime series
- Robert Gordon University, Scotland
- Royal Global University, India
- Russell Gaelic Union, Downpatrick, Gaelic football club, Ireland
- ISO 639:rgu, the ISO code for the Ringgou language
