= Rackmount KVM =

Computer front-end hardware in a rack-mounted form factor

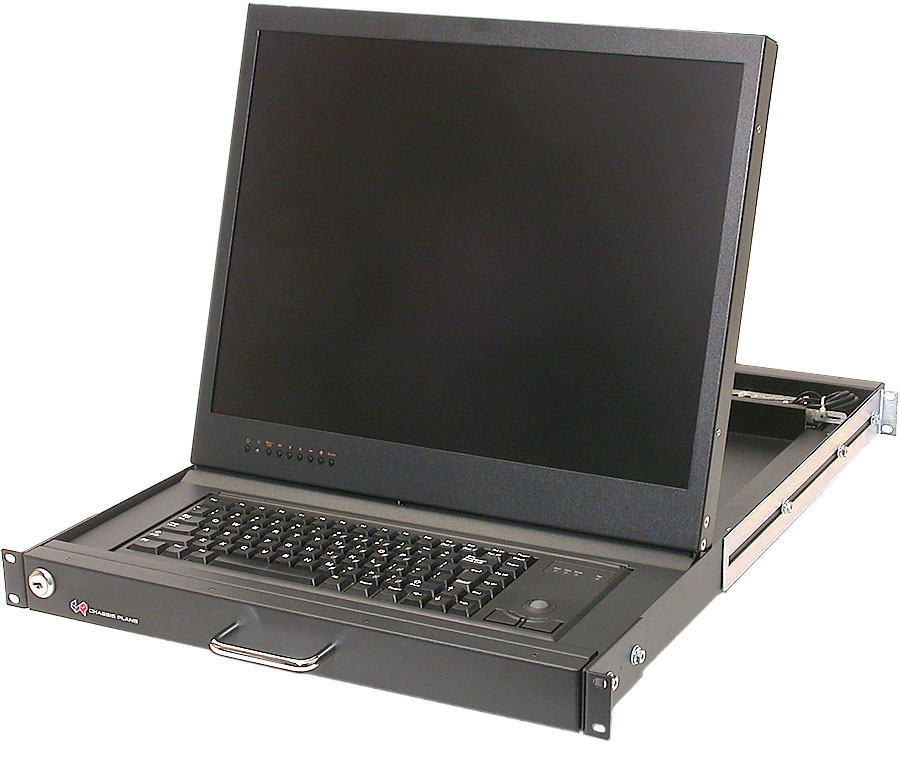
Rackmount lay-flat KVM

A KVM is a computer input/output device offering the combination of a keyboard, video monitor and mouse (pointing device). They are typically constructed to fit into a 19-inch rack although there are manufacturers who offer a KVM that can be mounted to a flat surface such as a control console.

== Etymology ==
KVMs did not exist until the advent of the LCD computer monitor. Prior to the introduction of the KVM, there existed rack-mounted CRT monitors and separate rack-mounted keyboards and mice. With the introduction of the LCD computer monitor, it became possible to combine the display with the keyboard and pointing device into a 1U, 2U or 3U rackmount form factor to create the KVM.

Ibus, a now defunct computer company, secured patent US5388032, filed May 4, 1993, showing a KVM with a "discriminator" to connect to multiple computers. The "discriminator" is now known as a KVM switch.

== Designs ==
There are two basic designs for KVMs: clamshell and lay-flat.

A Clamshell design hinges the display at the rear so that it folds forward over the keyboard for storage. The advantage to this design is shorter installed depth. The disadvantage is the 1U thickness of the assembly limits the available height for the keyboard and track-ball (if installed). Some KVMs have been designed to fit into 2U to allow a larger track-ball and full-travel keyboard to be installed.

A Lay-flat design hinges the display at the front edge of the display so that the display folds back. The advantage to this design is the full 1U height can be used for keyboard and track-ball height. The disadvantage is a much greater installed depth.

A design variation provides for a slim profile keyboard mounted in independent slides under the display and the display is hinged and mounted at the front of the unit. This allows the display to be deployed with the keyboard stowed so it does not protrude into aisle space. The display, when tilted upright, may only protrude an inch or so, effectively flush with the front of the rack. The keyboard can then be pulled out, used, and pushed back into the rack. These units still fit within 1U with a short installed depth. The disadvantage in this design is typically a laptop style keyboard will be used with limited keystroke.

== Signals ==
Input signals can be anything supported by the installed LCD controller and includes, but is not limited to, VGA, DVI-D, DVI-I, HDMI, Display Port, Video (Composite, HD-SDI) and so forth.

The form factor will also support non-traditional video and keyboard/mouse signals such as KVM over IP, depending on the installed control circuitry.

Output from the keyboard and pointing device can be either PS/2 or USB, or both, or can be routed through KVM over IP or similar technology.

== LCD size limitation ==
Due to width limitations of a 19-inch rack (approximately 17.75" between the inside rails), the largest LCD to be incorporated into a KVM was 20.1" with a 3:4 aspect ratio. A wide-format 16:9 or 16:10 20.1" display is too wide. It had been previously reported that LG, the last manufacturer for this form factor display, announced the product was End Of Life (EOL) in 2013. However, Sharp Electronics has introduced a new 20.1" display as of 2 December 2014. The most common LCD sizes currently in production are 15", 17", 19" and 20".

== Multi-display KVMs ==
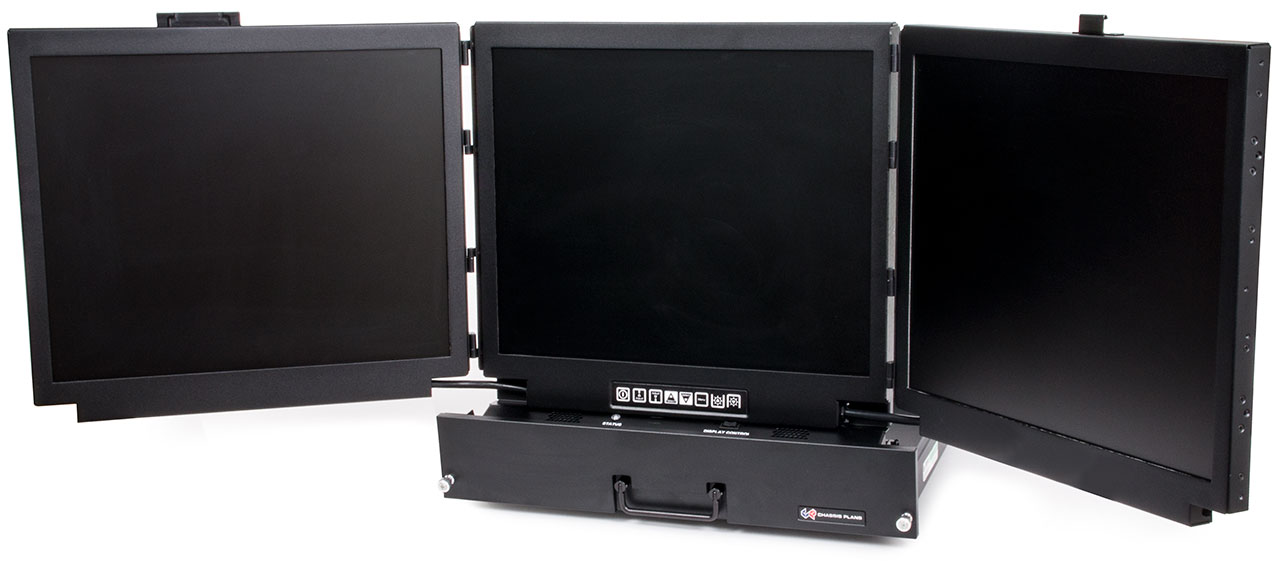
Triple-screen rackmount LCD

Several manufacturers have released KVM models providing two or three displays in a 2U or 3U height.

== Pointing device (mouse) ==
A wide variety of pointing devices are available to provide mouse functionality. Many keyboards include pointing devices such as a small trackball, touch pad, joy stick, or pointing stick. Similar pointing devices are available as stand-alone modules and can be installed separately from the keyboard. In a lay-flat design, there is sufficient height in a 1U design to install a larger 1-1/2" trackball and larger trackballs in the KVMs which are 2U in height. Some manufacturers have made provision for using a true mouse by providing a location for storage and a flat surface to use it on.

== Built-in KVM switch ==
Many KVMs are offered with a built-in KVM switch allowing the one KVM to control a number of connected computers without using an external KVM switch. The KVM switch can be controlled either by on-screen menus, hot-key commands, or, on some KVM models, via front accessible push buttons.
