= GPMI =

Digital audiovisual data interface

GPMI General Purpose Media Interface
- Type: Digital audio/video/data connector

Production history
- Designed: April 2025; 1 year ago
- Hot pluggable: Yes
- External: Yes
- Video signal: Maximum resolution limited by available bandwidth

Data
- Data signal: Yes

General Purpose Media Interface (GPMI) is an upcoming standard for an audio/video interface for transmitting uncompressed video data and compressed or uncompressed digital audio data from a source device, such as a display controller, to a computer monitor, video projector, digital television, or digital audio. GPMI is developed by Chinese companies and is intended to be a successor to HDMI.

The GPMI standard will be released in phases: home entertainment, automotive/transportation, and industrial applications. GPMI is developed by the Shenzhen 8K UHD Video Industry Cooperation Alliance (SUCA) that includes over fifty Chinese member companies, including Huawei, Skyworth, Hisense, and TCL. It is unclear whether GPMI will be a free standard or whether manufacturers will be required to pay a license fee as with HDMI.

== Specifications ==
GPMI supports data transmission rates up to 192 Gbps, accommodating ultra-high-definition video content such as 8K at 120 frames per second. It can power devices with up to 480 W of power. GPMI combines multiple signal types—including information flow, control signals, power supply, and audio/video—into a single cable, simplifying connectivity. It utilizes a sideband interaction channel to reduce device wake-up times to a quarter of those in comparable technologies. GPMI enables multi-channel bidirectional video transmission and mesh networking. GPMI operates in two modes.

Standard	Bandwidth	Power delivery	Notes
GPMI Type-B	192 Gbps	480W	Uses a proprietary connector.
GPMI Type-C	96 Gbps	240W	Uses USB-C connector. Same power limit as the Extended Power Range (EPR) standard.

=== Security ===
According to claims by the Lead Security Advisor Paiker Hussain, GPMI supports the ADCP content protection protocol. ADCP is based on China's national security cryptographic algorithms, including SM3 and SM4. ADCP will feature frame-level encryption. Authentication is claimed to be faster than HDCP. ADCP will feature secure communication between devices in a multi-node configuration. Two devices in a chain can communicate securely even with another device connected in between, reducing man-in-the-middle attacks.

=== Control ===
GPMI will include the ability to control connected devices, similar to HDMI-CEC.

=== Network ===
GPMI will be able to carry network traffic, removing the need for connected devices to connect directly to the network.

=== Link types ===
- Main Link (ML) – Supports 4-channel and 8-channel transmission. Each channel can contain 24 Gbps of unidirectional data. For example, in 8+0 configuration, 8 channels (192 Gbps) are dedicated to forward transmission with 0 channels to reverse transmission. In 6+2 configuration, 6 channels (144 Gbps) are dedicated to forward transmission with 2 channels (48 Gbps) dedicated to reverse transmission.
- Sideband Link (SL) – management of devices, ports, and bandwidth
- CableInfo Link (CL) – cable insertion and hot plug detection
- Power Link (PL) – bidirectional power supply
- USB2.0 Link (UL) – USB protocol ecosystem

== See also ==
- List of display interfaces
- DisplayPort
- Thunderbolt (interface)
