= DisplayPort =

Digital display interface

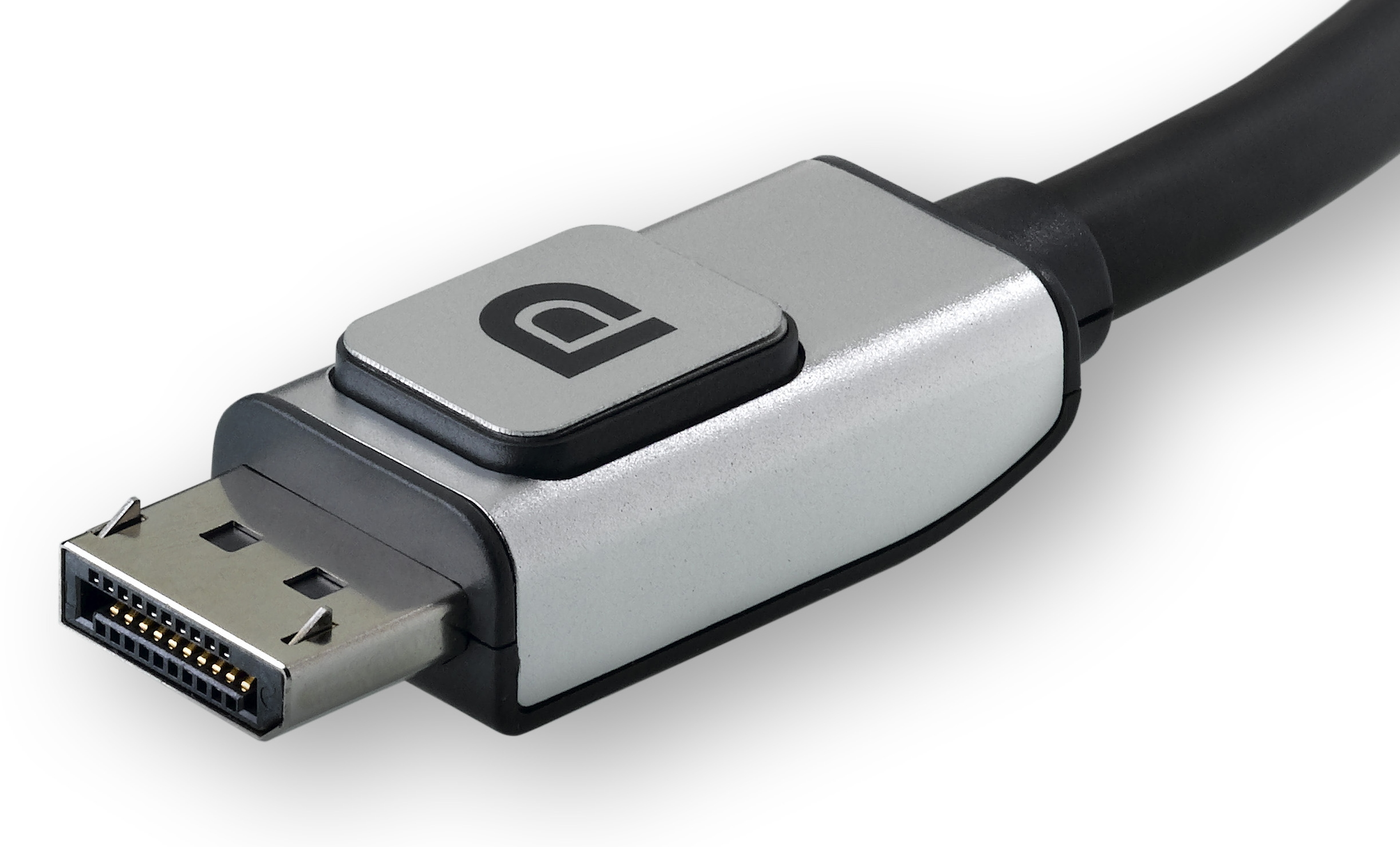
- DisplayPort connector
- Type: Digital video/audio/data connector

Production history
- Designer: VESA
- Designed: May 2006; 20 years ago
- Manufacturer: Various
- Produced: 2008–present
- Superseded: DVI, VGA
- Open standard?: No

General specifications
- Length: Various
- Hot pluggable: Yes
- External: Yes
- Pins: 20

Data
- Data signal: Yes
- Bitrate: Main link: 1.62, 2.7, 5.4, 8.1 or 20 Gbit/s per lane (1, 2 or 4 lanes); Aux. channel: 2 or 720 Mbit/s
- Protocol: Micro-packet

Pinout
- Pinout as looking at source side connector
- Pin 1: Main link lane 0 (+)
- Pin 2: Ground
- Pin 3: Main link lane 0 (−)
- Pin 4: Main link lane 1 (+)
- Pin 5: Ground
- Pin 6: Main link lane 1 (−)
- Pin 7: Main link lane 2 (+)
- Pin 8: Ground
- Pin 9: Main link lane 2 (−)
- Pin 10: Main link lane 3 (+)
- Pin 11: Ground
- Pin 12: Main link lane 3 (−)
- Pin 13: Cable adaptor detect
- Pin 14: Consumer Electronics Control
- Pin 15: Auxiliary channel (+)
- Pin 16: Ground
- Pin 17: Auxiliary channel (−)
- Pin 18: Hot plug detect
- Pin 19: Return for power
- Pin 20: Power (3.3 V 500 mA)
- This is the pinout on the source side. On the sink side (usually a display), the order is flipped: lane 3 connects to pins 1 (-) and 3 (+), while lane 0 connects to pins 10 (-) and 12 (+).

DisplayPort (DP) is a digital interface used to connect a video source, such as a computer, to a display device like a monitor. Developed by the Video Electronics Standards Association (VESA), it can also carry digital audio, USB, and other types of data over a single cable.

Introduced in 2008, DisplayPort was designed to replace older standards like VGA, DVI, and FPD-Link. While not directly compatible with these formats, adapters are available for connecting to HDMI, DVI, VGA, and other interfaces.

Unlike older interfaces, DisplayPort uses packet-based transmission, similar to how data is sent over USB or Ethernet. The design enables support for high resolutions and adding new features without changing the connector.

DisplayPort includes an auxiliary data channel used for device control and automatic configuration between source and display devices. It supports standards such as Display Data Channel (DDC), Extended Display Identification Data (EDID), Monitor Control Command Set (MCCS), and VESA Display Power Management Signaling (DPMS). Some implementations also support Consumer Electronics Control (CEC), which allows devices to send commands to each other and be operated using a single remote control.

== Versions ==
=== 1.0 to 1.1 ===
The first version, 1.0, was approved by VESA on 3 May 2006. Version 1.1 was ratified on 2 April 2007, and version 1.1a on 11 January 2008.

DisplayPort 1.0–1.1a allow a maximum bandwidth of 10.8 Gbit/s (8.64 Gbit/s data rate) over a standard 4-lane main link. DisplayPort cables up to 2 meters in length are required to support the full 10.8 Gbit/s bandwidth. DisplayPort 1.1 allows devices to implement alternative link layers such as fiber optic, allowing a much longer reach between source and display without signal degradation, although alternative implementations are not standardized. It also includes HDCP in addition to DisplayPort Content Protection (DPCP). The DisplayPort 1.1a standard can be downloaded free of charge from the VESA website.

=== 1.2 ===
DisplayPort version 1.2 was introduced on 7 January 2010. The most significant improvement of this version is the doubling of the data rate to 17.28 Gbit/s in High Bit Rate 2 (HBR2) mode, which allows increased resolutions, higher refresh rates, and greater color depth, such as 3840 × 2160 at 60 Hz 10 bpc RGB. Other improvements include multiple independent video streams (daisy-chain connection with multiple monitors) called Multi-Stream Transport (MST), facilities for stereoscopic 3D, increased AUX channel bandwidth (from 1 Mbit/s to 720 Mbit/s), more color spaces including xvYCC, scRGB, and Adobe RGB 1998, and Global Time Code (GTC) for sub 1 μs audio/video synchronisation. Also Apple Inc.'s Mini DisplayPort connector, which is much smaller and designed for laptop computers and other small devices, is compatible with the new standard.

=== 1.2a ===
DisplayPort version 1.2a was released in January 2013 and may optionally include VESA's Adaptive Sync. AMD's FreeSync uses the DisplayPort Adaptive-Sync feature for operation. FreeSync was first demonstrated at CES 2014 on a Toshiba Satellite laptop by making use of the Panel-Self-Refresh (PSR) feature from the Embedded DisplayPort standard, and after a proposal from AMD, VESA later adapted the Panel-Self-Refresh feature for use in standalone displays and added it as an optional feature of the main DisplayPort standard under the name "Adaptive-Sync" in version 1.2a. As it is an optional feature, support for Adaptive-Sync is not required for a display to be DisplayPort 1.2a-compliant.

=== 1.3 ===
DisplayPort version 1.3 was approved on 15 September 2014. This standard increases overall transmission bandwidth to 32.4 Gbit/s with the new HBR3 mode featuring 8.1 Gbit/s per lane (up from 5.4 Gbit/s with HBR2 in version 1.2), for a total data throughput of 25.92 Gbit/s after factoring in 8b/10b encoding overhead. This bandwidth is enough for a 4K UHD display (3840 × 2160) at 120 Hz with 24 bit/px RGB color, a 5K display (5120 × 2880) at 60 Hz with 30 bit/px RGB color, or an 8K UHD display (7680 × 4320) at 30 Hz with 24 bit/px RGB color. Using Multi-Stream Transport (MST), a DisplayPort port can drive two 4K UHD (3840 × 2160) displays at 60 Hz, or up to four WQXGA (2560 × 1600) displays at 60 Hz with 24 bit/px RGB color. The new standard includes mandatory Dual-mode for DVI and HDMI adapters, implementing the HDMI 2.0 standard and HDCP 2.2 content protection. The Thunderbolt 3 connection standard was originally to include DisplayPort 1.3 capability, but the final release ended up with only version 1.2 for Intel 6000 Series Thunderbolt 3 Controllers. Later Intel 7000 Series Thunderbolt 3 controllers support DisplayPort 1.4 capability including HDR. The VESA's Adaptive Sync feature in DisplayPort version 1.3 remains an optional part of the specification.

=== 1.4 ===
DisplayPort version 1.4 was published 1 March 2016. No new transmission modes are defined, so HBR3 (32.4 Gbit/s) as introduced in version 1.3 still remains as the highest available mode. DisplayPort 1.4 adds support for Display Stream Compression 1.2 (DSC), Forward Error Correction, HDR10 metadata defined in CTA-861.3, including static and dynamic metadata and the Rec. 2020 color space, for HDMI interoperability, and extends the maximum number of inline audio channels to 32.

=== 1.4a ===
DisplayPort version 1.4a was published in April 2018. VESA made no official press release for this version. It updated DisplayPort's Display Stream Compression implementation from DSC 1.2 to 1.2a.

=== 2.0 ===
On 26 June 2019, VESA formally released the DisplayPort 2.0 standard. VESA stated that version 2.0 is the first major update to the DisplayPort standard since March 2016, and provides up to a ≈3× improvement in data rate (from 25.92 to 77.37 Gbit/s) compared to the previous version of DisplayPort (1.4a), as well as new capabilities to address the future performance requirements of traditional displays. These include beyond 8K resolutions, higher refresh rates and high dynamic range (HDR) support at higher resolutions, improved support for multiple display configurations, as well as improved user experience with augmented/virtual reality (AR/VR) displays, including support for 4K-and-beyond VR resolutions.

According to a roadmap published by VESA in September 2016, a new version of DisplayPort was intended to be launched in "early 2017". It would have improved the link rate from 8.1 to 10.0 Gbit/s, a 23% increase. This would have increased the total bandwidth from 32.4 Gbit/s to 40.0 Gbit/s. However, no new version was released in 2017, likely delayed to make further improvements after the HDMI Forum announced in January 2017 that their next standard (HDMI 2.1) would offer up to 48 Gbit/s of bandwidth. According to a press release on 3 January 2018, "VESA is also currently engaged with its members in the development of the next DisplayPort standard generation, with plans to increase the data rate enabled by DisplayPort by two-fold and beyond. VESA plans to publish this update within the next 18 months." At CES 2019, VESA announced that the new version would support 8K @ 60 Hz without compression and was expected to be released in the first half of 2019.

==== DP 2.0 configuration examples ====
With the increased bandwidth enabled by DisplayPort 2.0, VESA offers a high degree of versatility and configurations for higher display resolutions and refresh rates. In addition to the above-mentioned 8K resolution at 60 Hz with HDR support, DP 2.0 (UHBR20) through USB-C as DisplayPort Alt Mode enables a variety of high-performance configurations:

- Single display resolutions
  - One 16K (15360 × 8640) display @ 60 Hz with 10 bpc (30 bit/px, HDR) RGB/Y′C_{B}C_{R} 4:4:4 color (with DSC)
  - One 10K (10240 × 4320) display @ 60 Hz and 8 bpc (24 bit/px, SDR) RGB/Y′C_{B}C_{R} 4:4:4 color (uncompressed)
- Dual display resolutions
  - Two 8K (7680 × 4320) displays @ 120 Hz and 10 bpc (30 bit/px, HDR) RGB/Y′C_{B}C_{R} 4:4:4 color (with DSC)
  - Two 4K (3840 × 2160) displays @ 144 Hz and 8 bpc (24 bit/px, SDR) RGB/Y′C_{B}C_{R} 4:4:4 color (uncompressed)
- Triple display resolutions
  - Three 10K (10240 × 4320) displays @ 60 Hz and 10 bpc (30 bit/px, HDR) RGB/Y′C_{B}C_{R} 4:4:4 color (with DSC)
  - Three 4K (3840 × 2160) displays @ 90 Hz and 10 bpc (30 bit/px, HDR) RGB/Y′C_{B}C_{R} 4:4:4 color (uncompressed)

When using only two lanes on the USB-C connector via DP Alt Mode to allow for simultaneous SuperSpeed USB data and video, DP 2.0 can enable such configurations as:

- Three 4K (3840 × 2160) displays @ 144 Hz and 10 bpc (30 bit/px, HDR) RGB/Y′C_{B}C_{R} 4:4:4 color (with DSC)
- Two 4K × 4K (4096 × 4096) displays (for AR/VR headsets) @ 120 Hz and 10 bpc (30 bit/px, HDR) RGB/Y′C_{B}C_{R} 4:4:4 color (with DSC)
- Three QHD (2560 × 1440) @ 120 Hz and 8 bpc (24 bit/px, SDR) RGB/Y′C_{B}C_{R} 4:4:4 color (uncompressed)
- One 8K (7680 × 4320) display @ 30 Hz and 10 bpc (30 bit/px, HDR) RGB/Y′C_{B}C_{R} 4:4:4 color (uncompressed)

=== 2.1 ===
VESA announced version 2.1 of the DisplayPort standard on 17 October 2022. This version incorporates the new DP40 and DP80 cable certifications, which test DisplayPort cables for proper operation at the UHBR10 (40 Gbit/s) and UHBR20 (80 Gbit/s) speeds introduced in version 2.0. Additionally, it revises some of the electrical requirements for DisplayPort devices in order to improve integration with USB4. In VESA's words:

DisplayPort 2.1 has tightened its alignment with the USB Type-C specification as well as the USB4 PHY specification to facilitate a common PHY servicing both DisplayPort and USB4. In addition, DisplayPort 2.1 has added a new DisplayPort bandwidth management feature to enable DisplayPort tunnelling to coexist with other data traffic more efficiently over the USB4 link.

=== 2.1a ===
VESA announced version 2.1a of the DisplayPort standard on 8 January 2024. This version replaces the DP40 cable certification with the new DP54 certification, which tests DisplayPort cables for proper operation at the UHBR13.5 (54 Gbit/s) speed introduced in version 2.0.

=== 2.1b ===
VESA announced version 2.1b of the DisplayPort standard on 6 January 2025. It has been released in Spring 2025.

DisplayPort 2.1b introduced the DP80LL ("low loss") active-cable specification, which supports four-lane UHBR20 operation at 80 Gbit/s over cables up to 3 metres long. VESA stated that this extends UHBR20 cable reach by up to three times compared with existing VESA-certified passive DP80 cables.

== Specifications ==
=== Main ===
	DisplayPort version				
	1.0–1.1a	1.2–1.2a	1.3	1.4–1.4a	2.0–2.1a
Release date	May 2006 (1.0); Mar 2007 (1.1); Jan 2008 (1.1a)	Jan 2010 (1.2); May 2012 (1.2a)	Sep 2014	Mar 2016 (1.4); Apr 2018 (1.4a)	Jun 2019 (2.0); Oct 2022 (2.1); Jan 2024 (2.1a)
Main link					
Transmission modes:					
RBR (1.62 Gbit/s per lane)	Yes	Yes	Yes	Yes	Yes
HBR (2.70 Gbit/s per lane)	Yes	Yes	Yes	Yes	Yes
HBR2 (5.40 Gbit/s per lane)	No	Yes	Yes	Yes	Yes
HBR3 (8.10 Gbit/s per lane)	No	No	Yes	Yes	Yes
UHBR 10 (10.0 Gbit/s per lane)	No	No	No	No	Yes
UHBR 13.5 (13.5 Gbit/s per lane)	No	No	No	No	Yes
UHBR 20 (20.0 Gbit/s per lane)	No	No	No	No	Yes
Number of lanes	4	4	4	4	4
Maximum total bandwidth (Note: Total bandwidth (the number of binary digits transmitted per second) is equal to the bandwidth per lane of the highest supported transmission mode multiplied by the number of lanes.)	10.80 Gbit/s	21.60 Gbit/s	32.40 Gbit/s	32.40 Gbit/s	80.00 Gbit/s
Maximum total data rate (Note: While the total bandwidth represents the number of physical bits transmitted across the interface, not all of the bits represent video data. Some of the transmitted bits are used for encoding purposes, so the rate at which video data can be transmitted across the DisplayPort interface is only a portion of the total bandwidth.)	8.64 Gbit/s	17.28 Gbit/s	25.92 Gbit/s	25.92 Gbit/s	77.37 Gbit/s
Encoding scheme (Note: The 8b/10b encoding scheme uses 10 bits of bandwidth to send 8 bits of data, so only 80% of the bandwidth is available for data throughput. The extra 2 bits are used for DC balancing (ensuring a roughly equal number of 1s and 0s). They consume bandwidth, but do not represent any data.)	8b/10b	8b/10b	8b/10b	8b/10b	128b/132b
Compression (optional)	–	–	–	DSC 1.2 (DP 1.4); DSC 1.2a (DP 1.4a)	DSC 1.2a
Auxiliary channel					
Maximum bandwidth	2 Mbit/s	720 Mbit/s	2 Mbit/s	2 Mbit/s	2 Mbit/s
Maximum data rate	1 Mbit/s	576 Mbit/s	1 Mbit/s	1 Mbit/s	1 Mbit/s
Encoding scheme	Manchester II	8b/10b	Manchester II	Manchester II	Manchester II
Color format support					
RGB	Yes	Yes	Yes	Yes	Yes
Y′C_{B}C_{R} 4:4:4	Yes	Yes	Yes	Yes	Yes
Y′C_{B}C_{R} 4:2:2	Yes	Yes	Yes	Yes	Yes
Y′C_{B}C_{R} 4:2:0	No	No	Yes	Yes	Yes
Y-only (monochrome)	No	Yes	Yes	Yes	Yes
Color depth support					
6 bpc (18 bit/px)	Yes	Yes	Yes	Yes	Yes
8 bpc (24 bit/px)	Yes	Yes	Yes	Yes	Yes
10 bpc (30 bit/px)	Yes	Yes	Yes	Yes	Yes
12 bpc (36 bit/px)	Yes	Yes	Yes	Yes	Yes
16 bpc (48 bit/px)	Yes	Yes	Yes	Yes	Yes
Color space support					
ITU-R BT.601	Yes	Yes	Yes	Yes	Yes
ITU-R BT.709	Yes	Yes	Yes	Yes	Yes
sRGB	No (Note: In DisplayPort 1.0–1.1a, RGB images are simply sent without any specific colorimetry information)	Yes	Yes	Yes	Yes
scRGB	No	Yes	Yes	Yes	Yes
xvYCC	No	Yes	Yes	Yes	Yes
Adobe RGB (1998)	No	Yes	Yes	Yes	Yes
DCI-P3	No	Yes	Yes	Yes	Yes
Simplified color profile	No	Yes	Yes	Yes	Yes
ITU-R BT.2020	No	No	Yes	Yes	Yes
Audio specifications					
Max. sample rate	192 kHz	768 kHz	768 kHz	1536 kHz	?
Max. sample size	24 bits	24 bits	24 bits	24 bits	?
Maximum audio channels	8	8	8	32	?
	1.0–1.1a	1.2–1.2a	1.3	1.4–1.4a	2.0–2.1a
DisplayPort version

==== Main link ====
The DisplayPort main link is used for transmission of video and audio. The main link consists of a number of unidirectional serial data channels which operate concurrently, called lanes. A standard DisplayPort connection has 4 lanes, though some applications of DisplayPort implement more, such as the Thunderbolt 3 interface which implements up to 8 lanes of DisplayPort.

In a standard DisplayPort connection, each lane has a dedicated set of twisted-pair wires, and transmits data across it using differential signaling. This is a self-clocking system, so no dedicated clock signal channel is necessary. Unlike DVI and HDMI, which vary their transmission speed to the exact rate required for the specific video format, DisplayPort only operates at a few specific speeds; any excess bits in the transmission are filled with "stuffing symbols".

In DisplayPort versions 1.0–1.4a, the data is encoded using ANSI 8b/10b encoding prior to transmission. With this scheme, only 8 out of every 10 transmitted bits represent data; the extra bits are used for DC balancing (ensuring a roughly equal number of 1s and 0s). As a result, the rate at which data can be transmitted is only 80% of the physical bitrate. The transmission speeds are also sometimes expressed in terms of the "Link Symbol Rate", which is the rate at which these 8b/10b-encoded symbols are transmitted (i.e. the rate at which groups of 10 bits are transmitted, 8 of which represent data). The following transmission modes are defined in version 1.0–1.4a:

- RBR (Reduced Bit Rate): 1.62 Gbit/s bandwidth per lane (162 MHz link symbol rate)
- HBR (High Bit Rate): 2.70 Gbit/s bandwidth per lane (270 MHz link symbol rate)
- HBR2 (High Bit Rate 2): 5.40 Gbit/s bandwidth per lane (540 MHz link symbol rate), introduced in DP 1.2
- HBR3 (High Bit Rate 3): 8.10 Gbit/s bandwidth per lane (810 MHz link symbol rate), introduced in DP 1.3

DisplayPort 2.0 uses 128b/132b encoding; each group of 132 transmitted bits represents 128 bits of data. This scheme has an efficiency of 96.9̅6̅%. In addition, a small amount of overhead is added for the link layer control packet and other miscellaneous operations, resulting in an overall efficiency of ≈96.7%. The following transmission modes are added in DP 2.0:

- UHBR 10 (Ultra High Bit Rate 10): 10.0 Gbit/s bandwidth per lane
- UHBR 13.5 (Ultra High Bit Rate 13.5): 13.5 Gbit/s bandwidth per lane
- UHBR 20 (Ultra High Bit Rate 20): 20.0 Gbit/s bandwidth per lane

The total bandwidth of the main link in a standard 4-lane connection is the aggregate of all lanes:

- RBR: 4 × 1.62 Gbit/s = 6.48 Gbit/s bandwidth (data rate of 5.184 Gbit/s or 648 MB/s with 8b/10b encoding)
- HBR: 4 × 2.70 Gbit/s = 10.80 Gbit/s bandwidth (data rate of 8.64 Gbit/s or 1.08 GB/s)
- HBR2: 4 × 5.40 Gbit/s = 21.60 Gbit/s bandwidth (data rate of 17.28 Gbit/s or 2.16 GB/s)
- HBR3: 4 × 8.10 Gbit/s = 32.40 Gbit/s bandwidth (data rate of 25.92 Gbit/s or 3.24 GB/s)
- UHBR 10: 4 × 10.0 Gbit/s = 40.00 Gbit/s bandwidth (data rate of 38.69 Gbit/s or 4.84 GB/s with 128b/132b encoding and FEC)
- UHBR 13.5: 4 × 13.5 Gbit/s = 54.00 Gbit/s bandwidth (data rate of 52.22 Gbit/s or 6.52 GB/s)
- UHBR 20: 4 × 20.0 Gbit/s = 80.00 Gbit/s bandwidth (data rate of 77.37 Gbit/s or 9.69 GB/s)

The transmission mode used by the DisplayPort main link is negotiated by the source and sink device (the device accepting the signal) when a connection is made, through a process called Link Training. This process determines the maximum possible speed of the connection. If the quality of the DisplayPort cable is insufficient to reliably handle HBR2 speeds for example, the DisplayPort devices will detect this and switch down to a lower mode to maintain a stable connection. The link can be re-negotiated at any time if a loss of synchronization is detected.

Audio data is transmitted across the main link during the video blanking intervals (short pauses between each line and frame of video data).

==== Auxiliary channel ====
The DisplayPort AUX channel is a half-duplex data channel used for miscellaneous additional data beyond video and audio, such as EDID (I^{2}C) or CEC commands. This bidirectional data channel is required, since the video lane signals are unidirectional (simplex) from source to display. AUX signals are transmitted across a dedicated set of twisted-pair wires. DisplayPort 1.0 specified Manchester encoding with a 2 MBd signal rate (1 Mbit/s data rate). Version 1.2 of the DisplayPort standard introduced a second transmission mode called FAUX (Fast AUX), which operated at 720 Mbit/s with 8b/10b encoding (576 Mbit/s data rate), but it was deprecated in version 1.3.

== Cables and connectors ==
=== Cables ===
==== Compatibility and feature support ====
All DisplayPort cables are compatible with all DisplayPort devices, regardless of the version of each device or the cable certification level.

All features of DisplayPort will function across any DisplayPort cable. DisplayPort does not have multiple cable designs; all DP cables have the same basic layout and wiring, and will support any feature including audio, daisy-chaining, G-Sync/FreeSync, HDR, and DSC.

DisplayPort cables differ in their transmission speed support. DisplayPort specifies seven different transmission modes (RBR, HBR, HBR2, HBR3, UHBR 10, UHBR 13.5, and UHBR 20) which support progressively higher bandwidths. Not all DisplayPort cables are capable of all seven transmission modes. VESA offers certifications for various levels of bandwidth. These certifications are optional, and not all DisplayPort cables are certified by VESA.

Cables with limited transmission speed are still compatible with all DisplayPort devices, but may place limits on the maximum resolution or refresh rate available.

DisplayPort cables are not classified by "version". Although cables are commonly labeled with version numbers, with HBR2 cables advertised as "DisplayPort 1.2 cables" for example, this notation is not permitted by VESA. The use of version numbers with cables can falsely imply that a DisplayPort 1.4 display requires a "DisplayPort 1.4 cable", or that features introduced in version 1.4 such as HDR or DSC will not function with older "DP 1.2 cables". DisplayPort cables are classified only by their bandwidth certification level (RBR, HBR, HBR2, HBR3, etc.), if they have been certified at all.

==== Cable bandwidth and certifications ====
Not all DisplayPort cables are capable of functioning at the highest levels of bandwidth. Cables may be submitted to VESA for an optional certification at various bandwidth levels. VESA offers five levels of cable certification: Standard, DP8K, DP40, DP54, and DP80. These certify DisplayPort cables for proper operation at the following speeds:

DisplayPort cable certifications
Transmission mode	Transmission bit rate	Minimum required cable certification
RBR (Reduced Bit Rate)	6.48 Gbit/s	Standard VESA-certified DisplayPort cable
HBR (High Bit Rate)	10.80 Gbit/s	Standard VESA-certified DisplayPort cable
HBR2 (High Bit Rate 2)	21.60 Gbit/s	Standard VESA-certified DisplayPort cable
HBR3 (High Bit Rate 3)	32.40 Gbit/s	DP8K DisplayPort cable
UHBR10 (Ultra High Bit Rate 10)	40.00 Gbit/s	DP40 cable
UHBR13.5 (Ultra High Bit Rate 13.5)	54.00 Gbit/s	DP54 cable
UHBR20 (Ultra High Bit Rate 20)	80.00 Gbit/s	DP80 cable

In April 2013, VESA published an article stating that the DisplayPort cable certification did not have distinct tiers for HBR and HBR2 bandwidth, and that any certified standard DisplayPort cable—including those certified under DisplayPort 1.1—would be able to handle the 21.6 Gbit/s bandwidth of HBR2 that was introduced with the DisplayPort 1.2 standard. The DisplayPort 1.2 standard defines only a single specification for High Bit Rate cable assemblies, which is used for both HBR and HBR2 speeds, although the DP cable certification process is governed by the DisplayPort PHY Compliance Test Standard (CTS) and not the DisplayPort standard itself.

The DP8K certification was announced by VESA in January 2018, and certifies cables for proper operation at HBR3 speeds (8.1 Gbit/s per lane, 32.4 Gbit/s total).

In June 2019, with the release of version 2.0 of the DisplayPort Standard, VESA announced that the DP8K certification was also sufficient for the new UHBR10 transmission mode. No new certifications were announced for the UHBR13.5 and UHBR20 modes. VESA is encouraging displays to use tethered cables for these speeds, rather than releasing standalone cables onto the market.

It should also be noted that the use of Display Stream Compression (DSC), introduced in DisplayPort 1.4, greatly reduces the bandwidth requirements for the cable. Formats which would normally be beyond the limits of DisplayPort 1.4, such as 4K (3840 × 2160) at 144 Hz 8 bpc RGB/Y′C_{B}C_{R} 4:4:4 (31.4 Gbit/s data rate when uncompressed), can only be implemented by using DSC. This would reduce the physical bandwidth requirements by 2–3×, placing it well within the capabilities of an HBR2-rated cable.

This exemplifies why DisplayPort cables are not classified by "version"; although DSC was introduced in version 1.4, this does not mean it needs a so-called "DP 1.4 cable" (an HBR3-rated cable) to function. HBR3 cables are only required for applications which exceed HBR2-level bandwidth, not simply any application involving DisplayPort 1.4. If DSC is used to reduce the bandwidth requirements to HBR2 levels, then an HBR2-rated cable will be sufficient.

In version 2.1, VESA introduced the DP40 and DP80 cable certification tiers, which validate cables for UHBR10 and UHBR20 speeds respectively. DisplayPort 2.1a introduced DP54 cable certification for UHBR13.5 speed.

==== Cable length ====
The DisplayPort standard does not specify any maximum length for cables, though the DisplayPort 1.2 standard does set a minimum requirement that all cables up to 2 meters in length must support HBR2 speeds (21.6 Gbit/s), and all cables of any length must support RBR speeds (6.48 Gbit/s). Cables longer than 2 meters may or may not support HBR/HBR2 speeds, and cables of any length may or may not support HBR3 speeds or above.

=== Connectors and pin configuration ===
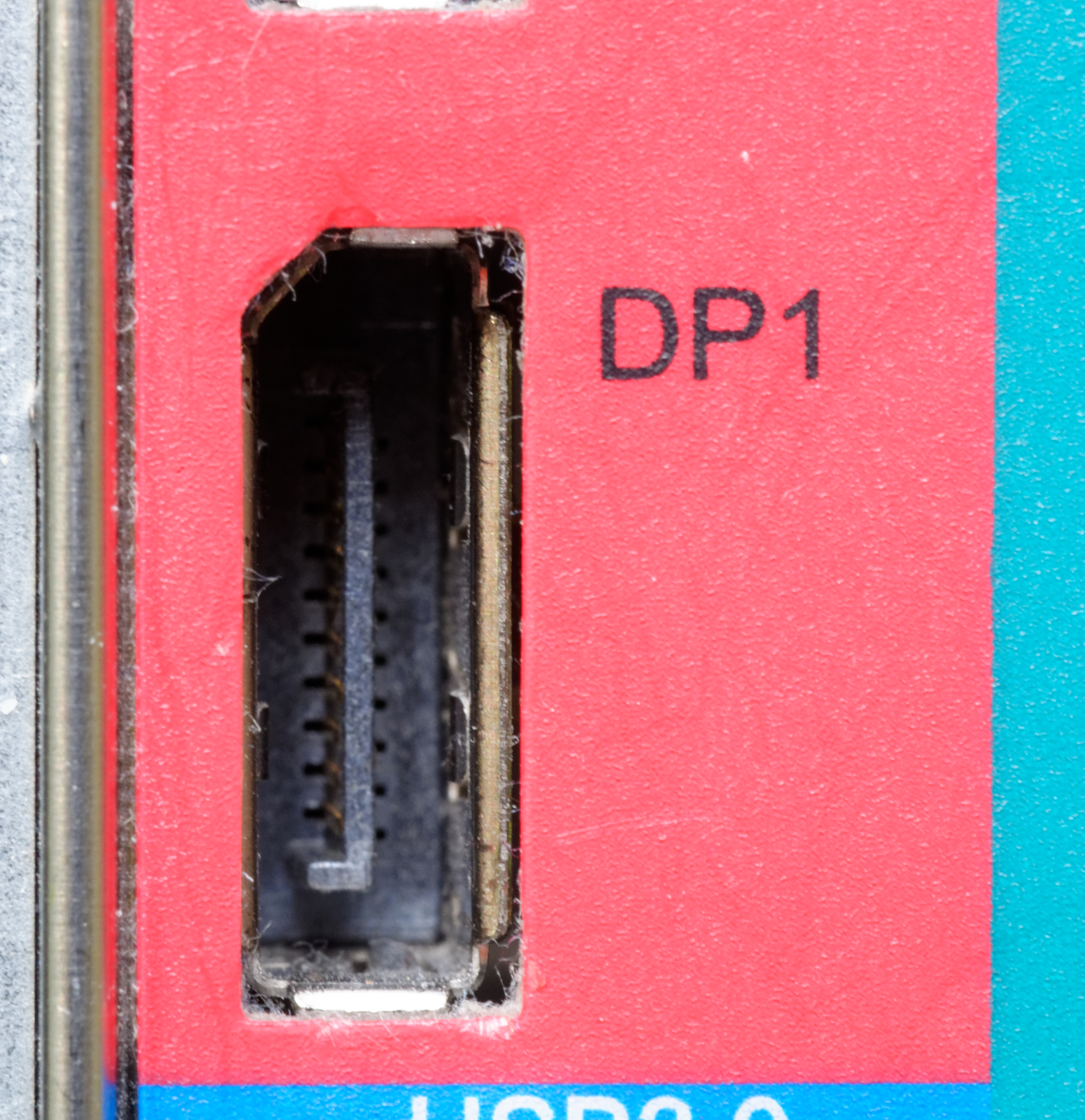
DisplayPort output on a computer

DisplayPort cables and ports may have either a "full-size" connector or a "mini" connector. These connectors differ only in physical shape—the capabilities of DisplayPort are the same regardless of which connector is used. Using a Mini DisplayPort connector does not affect performance or feature support of the connection.

==== Full-size DisplayPort connector ====
The standard DisplayPort connector (now referred to as a "full-size" connector to distinguish it from the mini connector) was the sole connector type introduced in DisplayPort 1.0. It is a 20-pin single-orientation connector with a friction lock and an optional mechanical latch. The standard DisplayPort receptacle has dimensions of 16.10 mm (width) × 4.76 mm (height) × 8.88 mm (depth).

The standard DisplayPort connector pin allocation is as follows:

- 12 pins for the main link – the main link consists of four shielded twisted pairs. Each pair requires 3 pins; one for each of the two wires, and a third for the shield. (pins 1–12)
- 2 additional ground pins – (pins 13 and 14)
- 3 pins for the auxiliary channel – the auxiliary channel uses another 3-pin shielded twisted pair (pins 15–17)
- 1 pin for HPD – hot-plug detection (pin 18)
- 2 pins for power – 3.3 V power and return line (pins 19 and 20)

==== Mini DisplayPort connector ====
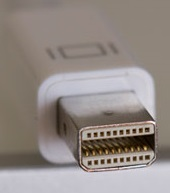
Mini DisplayPort plug

The Mini DisplayPort connector was developed by Apple for use in their computer products. It was first announced in October 2008 for use in the new MacBooks and Cinema Display. In 2009, VESA adopted it as an official standard, and in 2010 the specification was merged into the main DisplayPort standard with the release of DisplayPort 1.2. Apple freely licenses the specification to VESA.

The Mini DisplayPort (mDP) connector is a 20-pin single-orientation connector with a friction lock. Unlike the full-size connector, it does not have an option for a mechanical latch. The mDP receptacle has dimensions of 7.50 mm (width) × 4.60 mm (height) × 4.99 mm (depth). The mDP pin assignments are the same as the full-size DisplayPort connector.

==== DP_PWR (pin 20) ====
Pin 20 on the DisplayPort connector, called DP_PWR, provides 3.3 V (±10%) DC power at up to 500 mA (minimum power delivery of 1.5 W). This power is available from all DisplayPort receptacles, on both source and display devices. DP_PWR is intended to provide power for adapters, amplified cables, and similar devices, so that a separate power cable is not necessary.

Standard DisplayPort cable connections do not use the DP_PWR pin. Connecting the DP_PWR pins of two devices directly together through a cable can create a short circuit which can potentially damage devices, since the DP_PWR pins on two devices are unlikely to have exactly the same voltage (especially with a ±10% tolerance). For this reason, the DisplayPort 1.1 and later standards specify that passive DisplayPort-to-DisplayPort cables must leave pin 20 unconnected.

However, in 2013 VESA announced that after investigating reports of malfunctioning DisplayPort devices, it had discovered that a large number of non-certified vendors were manufacturing their DisplayPort cables with the DP_PWR pin connected:

Recently VESA has experienced quite a few complaints regarding troublesome DisplayPort operation that ended up being caused by improperly made DisplayPort cables. These "bad" DisplayPort cables are generally limited to non-DisplayPort certified cables, or off-brand cables. To further investigate this trend in the DisplayPort cable market, VESA purchased a number of non-certified, off-brand cables and found that an alarmingly high number of these were configured improperly and would likely not support all system configurations. None of these cables would have passed the DisplayPort certification test, moreover some of these cables could potentially damage a PC, laptop, or monitor.

The stipulation that the DP_PWR wire be omitted from standard DisplayPort cables was not present in the DisplayPort 1.0 standard. However, DisplayPort products (and cables) did not begin to appear on the market until 2008, long after version 1.0 had been replaced by version 1.1. The DisplayPort 1.0 standard was never implemented in commercial products.

== Resolution and refresh frequency limits ==
The tables below describe the refresh frequencies that can be achieved with each transmission mode. In general, maximum refresh frequency is determined by the transmission mode (RBR, HBR, HBR2, HBR3, UHBR10, UHBR13.5, or UHBR20). These transmission modes were introduced to the DisplayPort standard as follows:

- RBR and HBR were defined in the initial release of the DisplayPort standard, version 1.0
- HBR2 was introduced in version 1.2
- HBR3 was introduced in version 1.3
- UHBR10, UHBR13.5, and UHBR20 were introduced in version 2.0

However, transmission mode support is not necessarily dictated by a device's claimed "DisplayPort version number". For example, older versions of the DisplayPort Marketing Guidelines allowed a device to be labeled as "DisplayPort 1.2" if it supported the MST feature, even if it didn't support the HBR2 transmission mode. Newer versions of the guidelines have removed this clause, and currently (as of the June 2018 revision) there are no guidelines on the usage of DisplayPort version numbers in products. DisplayPort "version numbers" are therefore not a reliable indication of what transmission speeds a device can support.

In addition, individual devices may have their own arbitrary limitations beyond transmission speed. For example, NVIDIA Kepler GK104 GPUs (such as the GeForce GTX 680 and 770) support "DisplayPort 1.2" with the HBR2 transmission mode, but are limited to 540 Mpx/s, only 3/4 of the maximum possible with HBR2. Consequently, certain devices may have limitations that differ from those listed in the following tables.

To support a particular format, the source and display devices must both support the required transmission mode, and the DisplayPort cable must also be capable of handling the required bandwidth of that transmission mode. (See: Cables and connectors)

=== Refresh frequency limits for common resolutions ===
The maximum limits for the RBR and HBR modes are calculated using standard data rate calculations. For UHBR modes, the limits are based on the data efficiency calculations provided by the DisplayPort standard. All calculations assume uncompressed RGB video with CVT-RB v2 timing. Maximum limits may differ if compression (i.e. DSC) or Y′C_{B}C_{R} 4:2:2 or 4:2:0 chroma subsampling are used.

Display manufacturers may also use non-standard blanking intervals rather than CVT-RB v2 to achieve even higher frequencies when bandwidth is a constraint. The refresh frequencies in the below table do not represent the absolute maximum limit of each interface, but rather an estimate based on a modern standardized timing formula. The minimum blanking intervals (and therefore the exact maximum frequency that can be achieved) will depend on the display and how many secondary data packets it requires, and therefore will differ from model to model.

Video format			Transmission mode, and maximum data rate						
Short- hand	Resolution	Channel color depth (bits)	RBR	HBR	HBR2	HBR3	UHBR10	UHBR13.5	UHBR20
Short- hand	Resolution	Channel color depth (bits)	5.184 Gbit/s	8.64 Gbit/s	17.28 Gbit/s	25.92 Gbit/s	38.68 Gbit/s	52.22 Gbit/s	77.37 Gbit/s
Short- hand	Resolution	Channel color depth (bits)	Maximum refresh frequency with CVT-RB v2 timing, uncompressed (Hz)						
1080p	1920 × 1080	8	95	154	288	406	555	688	884
1080p	1920 × 1080	10	77	125	237	337	468	587	770
1440p	2560 × 1440	8	55	90	174	251	354	452	609
1440p	2560 × 1440	10	44	73	141	205	293	378	516
UWQHD	3440 × 1440	8	41	68	133	193	277	358	491
UWQHD	3440 × 1440	10	33	55	107	157	227	296	412
4K	3840 × 2160	8		41	81	120	174	229	323
4K	3840 × 2160	10		33	65	97	142	187	267
5K	5120 × 2880	8			47	69	102	136	195
5K	5120 × 2880	10			37	56	82	110	159
6K	6144 × 3456	8			32	49	72	96	140
6K	6144 × 3456	10				39	58	78	113
8K	7680 × 4320	8				31	47	63	92
8K	7680 × 4320	10					37	50	74

Below 30 Hz
30–60 Hz
60–120 Hz
120–240 Hz
Above 240 Hz

=== Refresh frequency limits for standard video ===
Color depth of 8 bpc (24 bit/px or 16.7 million colors) is assumed for all formats in these tables. This is the standard color depth used on most computer displays. Note that some operating systems refer to this as "32-bit" color depth—this is the same as 24-bit color depth. The 8 extra bits are for alpha channel information, which is only present in software. At the transmission stage, this information has already been incorporated into the primary color channels, so the actual video data transmitted across the cable only contains 24 bits per pixel.

Video format				Transmission mode / maximum data rate (Note: Only a portion of DisplayPort's bandwidth is used for carrying video data. The RBR, HBR, HBR2, and HBR3 transmission modes use 8b/10b encoding, which means that 80% of the bits transmitted across the link represent data, and the other 20% are used for encoding purposes. The maximum bit rates of these modes (6.48, 10.8, 21.6, and 32.4 Gbit/s) therefore transport video data at rates of 5.184, 8.64, 17.28, and 25.92 Gbit/s respectively. DisplayPort UHBR modes use 128b/132b encoding with some small additional overhead, and therefore the maximum bit rates of UHBR10, 13.5, and 20 (40, 54, and 80 Gbit/s) transport data at rates of 38.69, 52.22, and 77.37 Gbit/s.)						
Shorthand	Resolution	Refresh rate (Hz)	Data rate required (Note: These data rates are for uncompressed 8 bpc (24 bit/px) color depth with RGB or YC_{B}C_{R} 4:4:4 color format and CVT-RB v2 timing. Uncompressed data rate for RGB video in bits per second is calculated as bits per pixel × pixels per frame × frames per second. Pixels per frame includes blanking intervals as defined by CVT-RB v2.)	RBR	HBR	HBR2	HBR3	UHBR10	UHBR13.5	UHBR20
Shorthand	Resolution	Refresh rate (Hz)	Data rate required	5.184 Gbit/s	8.64 Gbit/s	17.28 Gbit/s	25.92 Gbit/s	38.69 Gbit/s	52.22 Gbit/s	77.37 Gbit/s
1080p	1920 × 1080	60	3.20 Gbit/s	Yes	Yes	Yes	Yes	Yes	Yes	Yes
1080p	1920 × 1080	85	4.59 Gbit/s	Yes	Yes	Yes	Yes	Yes	Yes	Yes
1080p	1920 × 1080	120	6.59 Gbit/s	DSC (Note: This format can only be achieved with full RGB color if DSC (display stream compression) is used.)	Yes	Yes	Yes	Yes	Yes	Yes
1080p	1920 × 1080	144	8.00 Gbit/s	DSC	Yes	Yes	Yes	Yes	Yes	Yes
1080p	1920 × 1080	240	14.00 Gbit/s	DSC	DSC	Yes	Yes	Yes	Yes	Yes
1440p	2560 × 1440	30	2.78 Gbit/s	Yes	Yes	Yes	Yes	Yes	Yes	Yes
1440p	2560 × 1440	60	5.63 Gbit/s	DSC	Yes	Yes	Yes	Yes	Yes	Yes
1440p	2560 × 1440	85	8.07 Gbit/s	DSC	Yes	Yes	Yes	Yes	Yes	Yes
1440p	2560 × 1440	120	11.59 Gbit/s	DSC	DSC	Yes	Yes	Yes	Yes	Yes
1440p	2560 × 1440	144	14.08 Gbit/s	DSC	DSC	Yes	Yes	Yes	Yes	Yes
1440p	2560 × 1440	165	16.30 Gbit/s	4:2:2 + DSC (Note: Possible by using Y′C_{B}C_{R} with 4:2:2 subsampling and DSC together, which permits a lower DSC bit rate of 7 bit/px)	DSC	Yes	Yes	Yes	Yes	Yes
1440p	2560 × 1440	240	24.62 Gbit/s	No	DSC	DSC	Yes	Yes	Yes	Yes
4K	3840 × 2160	24	4.93 Gbit/s	Yes	Yes	Yes	Yes	Yes	Yes	Yes
4K	3840 × 2160	30	6.18 Gbit/s	DSC	Yes	Yes	Yes	Yes	Yes	Yes
4K	3840 × 2160	60	12.54 Gbit/s	DSC	DSC	Yes	Yes	Yes	Yes	Yes
4K	3840 × 2160	75	15.79 Gbit/s	DSC	DSC	Yes	Yes	Yes	Yes	Yes
4K	3840 × 2160	120	25.82 Gbit/s	No	DSC	DSC	Yes	Yes	Yes	Yes
4K	3840 × 2160	144	31.35 Gbit/s	No	4:2:0 + DSC (Note: Possible by using Y′C_{B}C_{R} with 4:2:0 subsampling and DSC together, which permits a lower DSC bit rate of 6 bit/px)	DSC	DSC	Yes	Yes	Yes
4K	3840 × 2160	240	54.84 Gbit/s	No	No	4:2:2 + DSC	DSC	DSC	Yes (Note: Although this format slightly exceeds the maximum data rate of this transmission mode with CVT-RB v2 timing, it is close enough to be achieved with non-standard timings)	Yes
5K	5120 × 2880	24	8.73 Gbit/s	DSC	Yes	Yes	Yes	Yes	Yes	Yes
5K	5120 × 2880	30	10.94 Gbit/s	DSC	DSC	Yes	Yes	Yes	Yes	Yes
5K	5120 × 2880	60	22.18 Gbit/s	No	DSC	DSC	Yes	Yes	Yes	Yes
5K	5120 × 2880	120	45.66 Gbit/s	No	No	DSC	DSC	DSC	Yes	Yes
5K	5120 × 2880	144	55.44 Gbit/s	No	No	4:2:2 + DSC	DSC	DSC	DSC	Yes
5K	5120 × 2880	180	70.54 Gbit/s	No	No	No	DSC	DSC	DSC	Yes
5K	5120 × 2880	240	96.98 Gbit/s	No	No	No	4:2:0 + DSC	DSC	DSC	DSC
8K	7680 × 4320	24	19.53 Gbit/s	4:2:0 + DSC	DSC	DSC	Yes	Yes	Yes	Yes
8K	7680 × 4320	30	24.48 Gbit/s	No	DSC	DSC	Yes	Yes	Yes	Yes
8K	7680 × 4320	60	49.65 Gbit/s	No	No	DSC	DSC	DSC	Yes	Yes
8K	7680 × 4320	85	71.17 Gbit/s	No	No	No	DSC	DSC	DSC	Yes
8K	7680 × 4320	120	102.20 Gbit/s	No	No	No	No	DSC	DSC	DSC
8K	7680 × 4320	144	124.09 Gbit/s	No	No	No	No	4:2:2 + DSC	DSC	DSC
8K	7680 × 4320	240	217.10 Gbit/s	No	No	No	No	No	No	DSC
				RBR	HBR	HBR2	HBR3	UHBR10	UHBR13.5	UHBR20
Transmission mode

=== Refresh frequency limits for HDR video ===
Color depth of 10 bpc (30 bit/px or 1.07 billion colors) is assumed for all formats in these tables. This color depth is a requirement for various common HDR standards, such as HDR10. It requires 25% more bandwidth than standard 8 bpc video.

HDR extensions were defined in version 1.4 of the DisplayPort standard. Some displays support these HDR extensions, but may only implement HBR2 transmission mode if the extra bandwidth of HBR3 is unnecessary (for example, on 4K 60 Hz HDR displays). Since there is no definition of what constitutes a "DisplayPort 1.4" device, some manufacturers may choose to label these as "DP 1.2" devices despite their support for DP 1.4 HDR extensions. As a result, DisplayPort "version numbers" should not be used as an indicator of HDR support.

Video format				Transmission mode, and maximum data rate (Note: Only a portion of DisplayPort's bandwidth is used for carrying video data. The RBR, HBR, HBR2, and HBR3 transmission modes use 8b/10b encoding, which means that 80% of the bits transmitted across the link represent data, and the other 20% are used for encoding purposes. The maximum bit rates of these modes (6.48, 10.8, 21.6, and 32.4 Gbit/s) therefore transport video data at rates of 5.184, 8.64, 17.28, and 25.92 Gbit/s respectively. DisplayPort UHBR modes use 128b/132b encoding with some small additional overhead, and therefore the maximum bit rates of UHBR10, 13.5, and 20 (40, 54, and 80 Gbit/s) transport data at rates of 38.69, 52.22, and 77.37 Gbit/s.)						
Shorthand	Resolution	Refresh rate (Hz)	Data rate required (Note: These data rates are for uncompressed 10 bpc (30 bit/px) color depth with RGB or YC_{B}C_{R} 4:4:4 color format and CVT-RB v2 timing. Uncompressed data rate for RGB video in bits per second is calculated as bits per pixel × pixels per frame × frames per second. Pixels per frame includes blanking intervals as defined by CVT-RB v2.)	RBR	HBR	HBR2	HBR3	UHBR10	UHBR13.5	UHBR20
Shorthand	Resolution	Refresh rate (Hz)	Data rate required	5.184 Gbit/s	8.64 Gbit/s	17.28 Gbit/s	25.92 Gbit/s	38.69 Gbit/s	52.22 Gbit/s	77.37 Gbit/s
1080p	1920 × 1080	60	4.00 Gbit/s	Yes	Yes	Yes	Yes	Yes	Yes	Yes
1080p	1920 × 1080	100	6.80 Gbit/s	DSC (Note: This format can only be achieved with full RGB color if DSC (display stream compression) is used. A compression ratio of 3.75:1 (8 bit/px compression) is assumed here.)	Yes	Yes	Yes	Yes	Yes	Yes
1080p	1920 × 1080	120	8.24 Gbit/s	DSC	Yes	Yes	Yes	Yes	Yes	Yes
1080p	1920 × 1080	144	10.00 Gbit/s	DSC	DSC	Yes	Yes	Yes	Yes	Yes
1080p	1920 × 1080	240	17.50 Gbit/s	DSC	DSC	Yes (Note: Although this format slightly exceeds the maximum data rate of this transmission mode with CVT-RB v2 timing, it is close enough to be achieved with non-standard timings)	Yes	Yes	Yes	Yes
1440p	2560 × 1440	30	3.47 Gbit/s	Yes	Yes	Yes	Yes	Yes	Yes	Yes
1440p	2560 × 1440	60	7.04 Gbit/s	DSC	Yes	Yes	Yes	Yes	Yes	Yes
1440p	2560 × 1440	75	8.86 Gbit/s	DSC	Yes	Yes	Yes	Yes	Yes	Yes
1440p	2560 × 1440	120	14.49 Gbit/s	DSC	DSC	Yes	Yes	Yes	Yes	Yes
1440p	2560 × 1440	144	17.60 Gbit/s	DSC	DSC	Yes	Yes	Yes	Yes	Yes
1440p	2560 × 1440	200	25.12 Gbit/s	4:2:0 + DSC (Note: This format can only be achieved if DSC and chroma subsampling are used together. The DisplayPort standard permits lower values for DSC output size when subsampling is used; 6 bit/px for 4:2:0 subsampling and 7 bit/px for 4:2:2 subsampling, compared to 8 bit/px for non-subsampled output (RGB and 4:4:4).)	DSC	DSC	Yes	Yes	Yes	Yes
1440p	2560 × 1440	240	30.77 Gbit/s	No	DSC	DSC	DSC	Yes	Yes	Yes
4K	3840 × 2160	30	7.73 Gbit/s	DSC	Yes	Yes	Yes	Yes	Yes	Yes
4K	3840 × 2160	60	15.68 Gbit/s	DSC	DSC	Yes	Yes	Yes	Yes	Yes
4K	3840 × 2160	75	19.74 Gbit/s	4:2:2 + DSC	DSC	DSC	Yes	Yes	Yes	Yes
4K	3840 × 2160	98	26.07 Gbit/s	No	DSC	DSC	Yes	Yes	Yes	Yes
4K	3840 × 2160	120	32.27 Gbit/s	No	4:2:2 + DSC	DSC	DSC	Yes	Yes	Yes
4K	3840 × 2160	144	39.19 Gbit/s	No	4:2:0 + DSC	DSC	DSC	Yes	Yes	Yes
4K	3840 × 2160	180	49.85 Gbit/s	No	No	DSC	DSC	DSC	Yes	Yes
4K	3840 × 2160	240	68.56 Gbit/s	No	No	4:2:2 + DSC	DSC	DSC	DSC	Yes
5K	5120 × 2880	30	13.67 Gbit/s	DSC	DSC	Yes	Yes	Yes	Yes	Yes
5K	5120 × 2880	50	22.99 Gbit/s	4:2:0 + DSC	DSC	DSC	Yes	Yes	Yes	Yes
5K	5120 × 2880	60	27.72 Gbit/s	No	DSC	DSC	DSC	Yes	Yes	Yes
5K	5120 × 2880	100	47.10 Gbit/s	No	No	DSC	DSC	DSC	Yes	Yes
5K	5120 × 2880	120	57.08 Gbit/s	No	No	DSC	DSC	DSC	DSC	Yes
5K	5120 × 2880	144	69.30 Gbit/s	No	No	4:2:2 + DSC	DSC	DSC	DSC	Yes
5K	5120 × 2880	240	121.23 Gbit/s	No	No	No	4:2:0 + DSC	DSC	DSC	DSC
8K	7680 × 4320	24	24.41 Gbit/s	4:2:0 + DSC	DSC	DSC	Yes	Yes	Yes	Yes
8K	7680 × 4320	30	30.60 Gbit/s	No	DSC	DSC	DSC	Yes	Yes	Yes
8K	7680 × 4320	50	51.47 Gbit/s	No	No	DSC	DSC	DSC	Yes	Yes
8K	7680 × 4320	60	62.06 Gbit/s	No	No	DSC	DSC	DSC	DSC	Yes
8K	7680 × 4320	75	78.13 Gbit/s	No	No	4:2:0 + DSC	DSC	DSC	DSC	Yes
8K	7680 × 4320	120	127.75 Gbit/s	No	No	No	No	DSC	DSC	DSC
8K	7680 × 4320	144	155.11 Gbit/s	No	No	No	No	4:2:2 + DSC	DSC	DSC
8K	7680 × 4320	240	271.37 Gbit/s	No	No	No	No	No	No	DSC
				RBR	HBR	HBR2	HBR3	UHBR10	UHBR13.5	UHBR20
Transmission mode

== Features ==
	DisplayPort version					
	1.0	1.1–1.1a	1.2–1.2a	1.3	1.4–1.4a	2.0
Hot-pluggable	Yes	Yes	Yes	Yes	Yes	Yes
Inline audio	Yes	Yes	Yes	Yes	Yes	Yes
DisplayPort content protection (DPCP)	DPCP 1.0	DPCP 1.0	DPCP 1.0	DPCP 1.0	DPCP 1.0	DPCP 1.0
High-bandwidth digital content protection (HDCP)	No	HDCP 1.3	HDCP 1.3	HDCP 2.2	HDCP 2.2	HDCP 2.2
Dual-mode (DP++)	No	Yes	Yes	Yes	Yes	Yes
Maximum DP++ bandwidth (TMDS Clock)	—N/a	4.95 Gbit/s (165 MHz)	9.00 Gbit/s (300 MHz)	18.00 Gbit/s (600 MHz)	18.00 Gbit/s (600 MHz)	18.00 Gbit/s (600 MHz)
Stereoscopic 3D video	No	Yes	Yes	Yes	Yes	Yes
Multi-stream transport (MST)	No	No	Yes	Yes	Yes	Yes
High-dynamic-range video (HDR)	No	No	No	No	Yes	Yes
Display stream compression (DSC)	No	No	No	No	DSC 1.2 (DP 1.4); DSC 1.2a (DP 1.4a)	DSC 1.2a
Panel replay	No	No	No	No	No	Yes

=== DisplayPort Dual-Mode (DP++) ===
Dual-mode DisplayPort logo

Dual-mode pin mapping
DisplayPort pins	DVI/HDMI mode
Main link lane 0	TMDS channel 2
Main link lane 1	TMDS channel 1
Main link lane 2	TMDS channel 0
Main link lane 3	TMDS clock
AUX CH+	DDC clock
AUX CH−	DDC data
DP_PWR	DP_PWR
Hot-plug detect	Hot-plug detect
Config 1	Cable adapter detect
Config 2	CEC (HDMI only)

DisplayPort Dual-Mode (DP++), also called Dual-Mode DisplayPort, is a standard which allows DisplayPort sources to use simple level-shifting adapters to connect to HDMI or DVI displays. Dual-mode is an optional feature, so not all DisplayPort sources necessarily support sending DVI/HDMI signals, though in practice nearly all devices do. Officially, the "DP++" logo should be used to indicate a DP port that supports dual-mode, but most modern devices do not use the logo.

Devices which implement dual-mode will detect that a DVI or HDMI adapter is attached, and send DVI/HDMI TMDS signals instead of DisplayPort signals. The original DisplayPort Dual-Mode standard (version 1.0), used in DisplayPort 1.1 devices, only supported TMDS clock speeds of up to 165 MHz (4.95 Gbit/s bandwidth). This is equivalent to HDMI 1.2, and is sufficient for up to 1920 × 1200 at 60 Hz.

In 2013, VESA released the Dual-Mode 1.1 standard, which added support for up to a 300 MHz TMDS clock (9.00 Gbit/s bandwidth), and is used in newer DisplayPort 1.2 devices. This is slightly less than the 340 MHz maximum of HDMI 1.4, and is sufficient for up to 1920 × 1080 at 120 Hz, 2560 × 1440 at 60 Hz, or 3840 × 2160 at 30 Hz. Older adapters, which were only capable of the 165 MHz speed, were retroactively termed "Type 1" adapters, with the new 300 MHz adapters being called "Type 2".

==== Dual-mode limitations ====
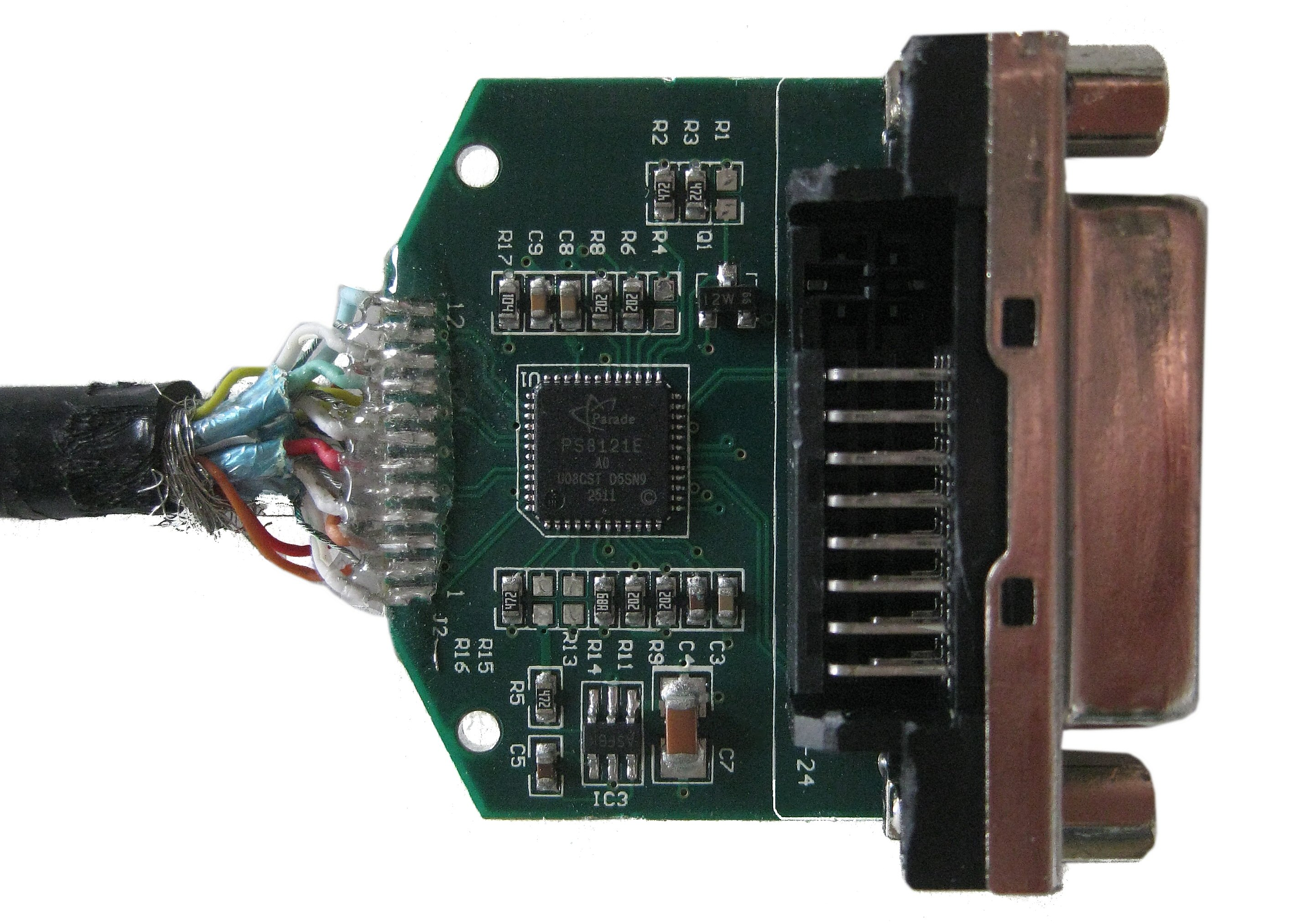
A DisplayPort to DVI adapter after removing its enclosure. The chip on the board converts the voltage levels generated by the dual-mode DisplayPort device to be compatible with a DVI monitor. Despite the chip, this is often categorized as a passive adapter, as no significant protocol translation is taking place.

- Limited adapter speed – Although the pinout and digital signal values transmitted by the DP port are identical to a native DVI/HDMI TMDS source, the transmission lines on a DisplayPort source are AC-coupled (a series capacitor isolates the line from passing DC voltages) while DVI and HDMI TMDS are DC-coupled. As a result, dual-mode adapters must contain a level-shifting circuit which couples the signal lines to a DC source. The presence of this circuit places a limit on how quickly the adapter can operate, and therefore newer adapters are required for each higher speed added to the standard.
- Unidirectional – Although the dual-mode standard specifies a method for DisplayPort sources to output DVI/HDMI signals using simple passive adapters, there is no counterpart standard to give DisplayPort displays the ability to receive DVI/HDMI input signals through passive adapters. As a result, DisplayPort displays can only receive native DisplayPort signals; any DVI or HDMI input signals must be converted to the DisplayPort format with an active conversion device. DVI and HDMI sources cannot be connected to DisplayPort displays using passive adapters.
- Single-link DVI only – Since DisplayPort dual-mode operates by using the pins of the DisplayPort connector to send DVI/HDMI signals, the 20-pin DisplayPort connector can only produce a single-link DVI signal (which uses 19 pins). A dual-link DVI signal uses 25 pins, and is therefore impossible to transmit natively from a DisplayPort connector through a passive adapter. Dual-link DVI signals can only be produced by converting from native DisplayPort output signals with an active conversion device.
- Unavailable on USB-C – The DisplayPort Alternate Mode specification for sending DisplayPort signals over a USB-C cable does not include support for the dual-mode protocol. As a result, DP-to-DVI and DP-to-HDMI passive adapters do not function when chained from a USB-C to DP adapter.

=== Multi-Stream Transport (MST) ===
Multi-Stream Transport is a feature first introduced in the DisplayPort 1.2 standard. It allows multiple independent displays to be driven from a single DP port on the source devices by multiplexing several video streams into a single stream and sending it to a branch device, which demultiplexes the signal into the original streams. Branch devices are commonly found in the form of an MST hub, which plugs into a single DP input port and provides multiple outputs, but it can also be implemented on a display internally to provide a DP output port for daisy-chaining, effectively embedding a 2-port MST hub inside the display. Theoretically, up to 63 displays can be supported, but the combined data rate requirements of all the displays cannot exceed the limits of a single DP port (17.28 Gbit/s for a DP 1.2 port, or 25.92 Gbit/s for a DP 1.3/1.4 port). In addition, the maximum number of links between the source and any device (i.e. the maximum length of a daisy-chain) is 7, and the maximum number of physical output ports on each branch device (such as a hub) is 7. With the release of MST, standard single-display operation has been retroactively named "SST" mode (Single-Stream Transport).

Daisy-chaining is a feature that must be specifically supported by each intermediary display; not all DisplayPort 1.2 devices support it. Daisy-chaining requires a dedicated DisplayPort output port on the display. Standard DisplayPort input ports found on most displays cannot be used as a daisy-chain output. Only the last display in the daisy-chain does not need to support the feature specifically or have a DP output port. DisplayPort 1.1 displays can also be connected to MST hubs, and can be part of a DisplayPort daisy-chain if it is the last display in the chain.

The host system's software also needs to support MST for hubs or daisy-chains to work. While Microsoft Windows environments have full support for it, Apple operating systems currently do not support MST hubs or DisplayPort daisy-chaining as of macOS 10.15 ("Catalina"). DisplayPort-to-DVI and DisplayPort-to-HDMI adapters/cables may or may not function from an MST output port; support for this depends on the specific device.

MST is supported by USB Type-C DisplayPort Alternate Mode, so standard DisplayPort daisy-chains and MST hubs do function from Type-C sources with a simple Type-C to DisplayPort adapter.

=== High dynamic range (HDR) ===
Support for HDR video was introduced in DisplayPort 1.4. It implements the CTA 861.3 standard for transport of static HDR metadata in EDID.

=== Content protection ===
DisplayPort 1.0 includes optional DPCP (DisplayPort Content Protection) from Philips, which uses 128-bit AES encryption. It also features full authentication and session key establishment. Each encryption session is independent, and it has an independent revocation system. This portion of the standard is licensed separately. It also adds the ability to verify the proximity of the receiver and transmitter, a technique intended to ensure users are not bypassing the content protection system to send data out to distant, unauthorized users.

DisplayPort 1.1 added optional implementation of industry-standard 56-bit HDCP (High-bandwidth Digital Content Protection) revision 1.3, which requires separate licensing from the Digital Content Protection LLC.

DisplayPort 1.3 added support for HDCP 2.2, which is also used by HDMI 2.0.

== Cost ==
VESA, the creators of the DisplayPort standard, state that the standard is royalty-free to implement. However, in March 2015, MPEG LA issued a press release stating that a royalty rate of $0.20 per unit applies to DisplayPort products manufactured or sold in countries that are covered by one or more of the patents in the MPEG LA license pool, which includes patents from Hitachi Maxell, Philips, Lattice Semiconductor, Rambus, and Sony. In response, VESA updated its DisplayPort FAQ page in November 2015 with the following statement:

MPEG LA is making claims that DisplayPort implementation requires a license and a royalty payment. It is important to note that these are only CLAIMS. Whether these CLAIMS are relevant will likely be decided in a US court.

By March 2017, that statement had been removed from the official FAQ, while the various other references to being royalty-free were kept. By November 2018, mentions of DisplayPort being royalty-free were removed from the FAQ.

While VESA does not charge any per-device royalty fees, VESA requires membership for access to said standards. The minimum cost is presently $5,000 (or $10,000 depending on Annual Corporate Sales Revenue) annually.

== Comparison with HDMI ==
Although DisplayPort has much of the same functionality as HDMI, it is a complementary connection used in different scenarios. A dual-mode DisplayPort port can emit an HDMI signal via a passive adapter.

=== Licensing ===
As of 2008, HDMI Licensing, LLC charged an annual fee of US$10,000 to each high-volume manufacturer, plus a per-unit royalty of US$0.04–0.15.

As of 2025, DisplayPort remains royalty-free; VESA charges no per-device or per-port fees, requiring only membership to access the specification.

Some third-party patent pools have previously claimed potential royalties for certain DisplayPort-related patents, but VESA continues to state that the standard itself is provided on a royalty-free basis.

=== Bandwidth ===
DisplayPort 1.2 has more bandwidth at 21.6 Gbit/s (17.28 Gbit/s plus overhead) as opposed to HDMI 2.0's 18 Gbit/s (14.4 Gbit/s plus overhead).

DisplayPort 1.3 increased the bandwidth to 32.4 Gbit/s (25.92 Gbit/s plus overhead). HDMI 2.1 matched that by increasing the bandwidth up to 48 Gbit/s (42.67 Gbit/s plus overhead), adding an additional TMDS link in place of clock lane. In 2019, DisplayPort 2.0 once again achieved the bandwidth superiority of 80.0 Gbit/s.

DisplayPort can also share bandwidth through the use of the Multi-Stream Transport (MST), which enables a single DP port to carry signals of several devices, to be demultiplexed at a branch hub.

=== Forked connectivity ===
HDMI has supported Consumer Electronics Control (CEC) commands since the first version. The CEC bus allows connecting multiple sources to a single display, and controlling any of these devices from any remote. DisplayPort 1.3 added the possibility of transmitting CEC commands over the AUX channel.

On the other hand, DisplayPort supports connecting multiple displays to one DP port via the Multi-Stream Transport (MST) feature, allowing a single computer to have multiple displays.

These differences reflects the origins the two standards, and the priorities of their authors. HDMI originates from consumer electronics companies, whereas DisplayPort is owned by VESA, which started as an organization for computer standards.

=== Other areas ===
HDMI relies on the Vendor-Specific Block structure for features such as additional color spaces. DisplayPort uses the CEA EDID extensions.

Both HDMI and DisplayPort have published specification for transmitting their signal over the USB-C connector (see USB-C § Alternate Mode partner specifications).

== Adoption ==
In 2009, 5.1% of commercial desktops and 2.1% of commercial notebooks released that year featured DisplayPort, according to figures from IDC. At the time, VGA was being phased out, and both Intel and AMD planned to stop building products with FPD-Link by 2013.

In 2017, the "Interface Battleground Report" from IHS Markit (now Informa Omdia) forecast that DisplayPort would surpass HDMI in 2019. However, the 2024 report predicted that HDMI would remain the market leader through 2026.

== Companion standards ==
=== Mini DisplayPort ===
Mini DisplayPort (mDP) is a standard announced by Apple in the fourth quarter of 2008. Shortly after announcing Mini DisplayPort, Apple announced that it would license the connector technology with no fee. The following year, in early 2009, VESA announced that Mini DisplayPort would be included in the upcoming DisplayPort 1.2 specification. On 24 February 2011, Apple and Intel announced Thunderbolt, a successor to Mini DisplayPort which adds support for PCI Express data connections while maintaining backwards compatibility with Mini DisplayPort based peripherals.

=== Micro DisplayPort ===
Micro DisplayPort would have targeted systems that need ultra-compact connectors, such as phones, tablets and ultra-portable notebook computers. This standard would have been physically smaller than the currently available Mini DisplayPort connectors. The standard was expected to be released by Q2 2014.

=== DDM ===
Direct Drive Monitor (DDM) 1.0 standard was approved in December 2008. It allows for controller-less monitors where the display panel is directly driven by the DisplayPort signal, although the available resolutions and color depth are limited to two-lane operation.

=== Display Stream Compression ===
Display Stream Compression (DSC) is a VESA-developed video compression algorithm designed to enable increased display resolutions and frame rates over existing physical interfaces, and make devices smaller and lighter, with longer battery life.

=== eDP ===
Embedded DisplayPort (eDP) is a display panel interface standard for portable and embedded devices. It defines the signaling interface between graphics cards and integrated displays. The various revisions of eDP are based on existing DisplayPort standards. However, version numbers between the two standards are not interchangeable. For instance, eDP version 1.4 is based on DisplayPort 1.2, while eDP version 1.4a is based on DisplayPort 1.3. Unlike standard DisplayPort, the Embedded DisplayPort lacks backward compatibility.

eDP 1.0 was adopted in December 2008. It included advanced power-saving features such as seamless refresh rate switching.

Version 1.1 was approved in October 2009 followed by version 1.1a in November 2009.

Version 1.2 was approved in May 2010 and includes DisplayPort 1.2 HBR2 data rates, 120 Hz sequential color monitors, and a new display panel control protocol that works through the AUX channel.

Version 1.3 was published in February 2011; it includes a new optional Panel Self-Refresh (PSR) feature developed to save system power and further extend battery life in portable PC systems. PSR mode allows the GPU to enter a power saving state in between frame updates by including framebuffer memory in the display panel controller.

Version 1.4 was released in February 2013; it reduces power consumption through partial-frame updates in PSR mode, regional backlight control, lower interface voltages, and additional link rates; the auxiliary channel supports multi-touch panel data to accommodate different form factors.
Version 1.4a was published in February 2015; the underlying DisplayPort version was updated to 1.3 in order to support HBR3 data rates, Display Stream Compression 1.1, Segmented Panel Displays, and partial updates for Panel Self-Refresh.
Version 1.4b was published in October 2015; its protocol refinements and clarifications are intended to enable adoption of eDP 1.4b in devices by mid-2016.

Version 1.5 was published in October 2021; adds new features and protocols, including enhanced support for Adaptive-Sync, that provide additional power savings and improved gaming and media playback performance.

=== iDP ===
Internal DisplayPort (iDP) is a standard that defines an internal link between a digital TV system on a chip controller and the display panel's timing controller. Version 1.0 was approved in April 2010. It aims to replace currently used internal FPD-Link lanes with a DisplayPort connection. iDP features a unique physical interface and protocols, which are not directly compatible with DisplayPort and are not applicable to external connection, however they enable very high resolution and refresh rates while providing simplicity and extensibility. iDP features a non-variable 2.7 GHz clock and is nominally rated at 3.24 Gbit/s per lane, with up to sixteen lanes in a bank, resulting in a six-fold decrease in wiring requirements over FPD-Link for a 1080p24 signal; other data rates are also possible. iDP was built with simplicity in mind so doesn't have an AUX channel, content protection, or multiple streams; it does however have frame sequential and line interleaved stereo 3D.

=== PDMI ===
Portable Digital Media Interface (PDMI) is an interconnection between docking stations/display devices and portable media players, which includes 2-lane DisplayPort v1.1a connection. It has been ratified in February 2010 as ANSI/CEA-2017-A.

=== wDP ===
Wireless DisplayPort (wDP) enables the bandwidth and feature set of DisplayPort 1.2 for cable-free applications operating in the 60 GHz radio band. It was announced in November 2010 by WiGig Alliance and VESA as a cooperative effort.

=== SlimPort ===
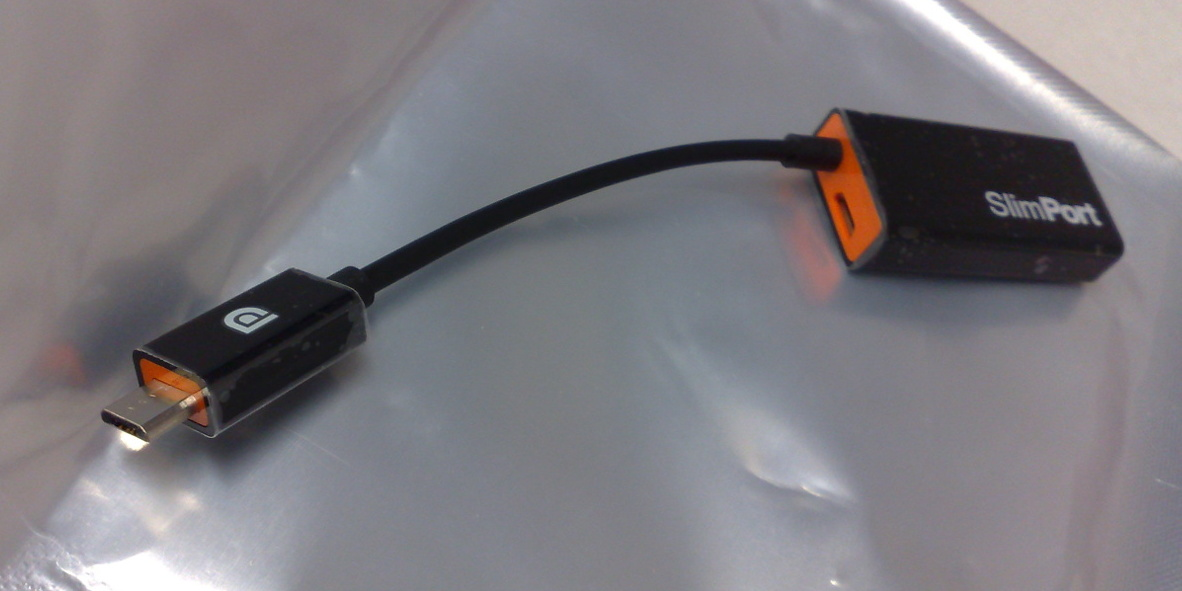
A SlimPort-to-HDMI adapter, made by Analogix

SlimPort, a brand of Analogix products, complies with Mobility DisplayPort, also known as MyDP, which is an industry standard for a mobile audio/video Interface, providing connectivity from mobile devices to external displays and HDTVs. SlimPort implements the transmission of video up to 4K-UltraHD and up to eight channels of audio over the micro-USB connector to an external converter accessory or display device. SlimPort products support seamless connectivity to DisplayPort, HDMI and VGA displays. The MyDP standard was released in June 2012, and the first product to use SlimPort was Google's Nexus 4 smartphone. Some LG smartphones in LG G series also adopted SlimPort.

SlimPort is an alternative to Mobile High-Definition Link (MHL).

=== DisplayID ===
DisplayID is designed to replace the E-EDID standard. DisplayID features variable-length structures which encompass all existing EDID extensions as well as new extensions for 3D displays and embedded displays.

The latest version 1.3 (announced on 23 September 2013) adds enhanced support for tiled display topologies; it allows better identification of multiple video streams, and reports bezel size and locations. As of December 2013, many current 4K displays use a tiled topology, but lack a standard way to report to the video source which tile is left and which is right. These early 4K displays, for manufacturing reasons, typically use two 1920×2160 panels laminated together and are currently generally treated as multiple-monitor setups. DisplayID 1.3 also allows 8K display discovery, and has applications in stereo 3D, where multiple video streams are used.

=== DockPort ===
DockPort, formerly known as Lightning Bolt, is an extension to DisplayPort to include USB 3.0 data as well as power for charging portable devices from attached external displays. Originally developed by AMD and Texas Instruments, it has been announced as a VESA specification in 2014.

=== USB-C ===
On 22 September 2014, VESA published the DisplayPort Alternate Mode on USB Type-C Connector Standard, a specification on how to send DisplayPort signals over the newly released USB-C connector. One, two or all four of the differential pairs that USB uses for the SuperSpeed bus can be configured dynamically to be used for DisplayPort lanes. In the first two cases, the connector still can carry a full SuperSpeed signal; in the latter case, at least a non-SuperSpeed signal is available. The DisplayPort AUX channel is also supported over the two sideband signals over the same connection; furthermore, USB Power Delivery according to the newly expanded USB-PD 2.0 specification is possible at the same time. This makes the Type-C connector a strict superset of the use cases envisioned for DockPort, SlimPort, and Mini and Micro DisplayPort. However, DisplayPort Dual-Mode (DP++) is not supported under USB-C alternate mode.

=== VirtualLink ===
VirtualLink was a proposal to allow the power, video, and data required to drive virtual reality headsets to be delivered over a single USB-C cable. The proposal was abandoned in September 2020.

== Products ==
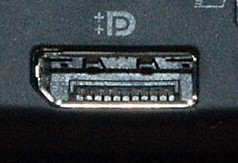
A Dual-mode DisplayPort connector

Since DisplayPort's introduction in 2006, it has gained popularity within the computer industry and is featured on many graphics cards, displays, and notebook computers. Dell was the first company to introduce a consumer product with a DisplayPort connector, the Dell UltraSharp 3008WFP, which was released in January 2008. Soon after, AMD and Nvidia released products to support the technology. AMD included support in the Radeon HD 3000 series of graphics cards, and Nvidia first introduced support in the GeForce 9 series starting with the GeForce 9600 GT.

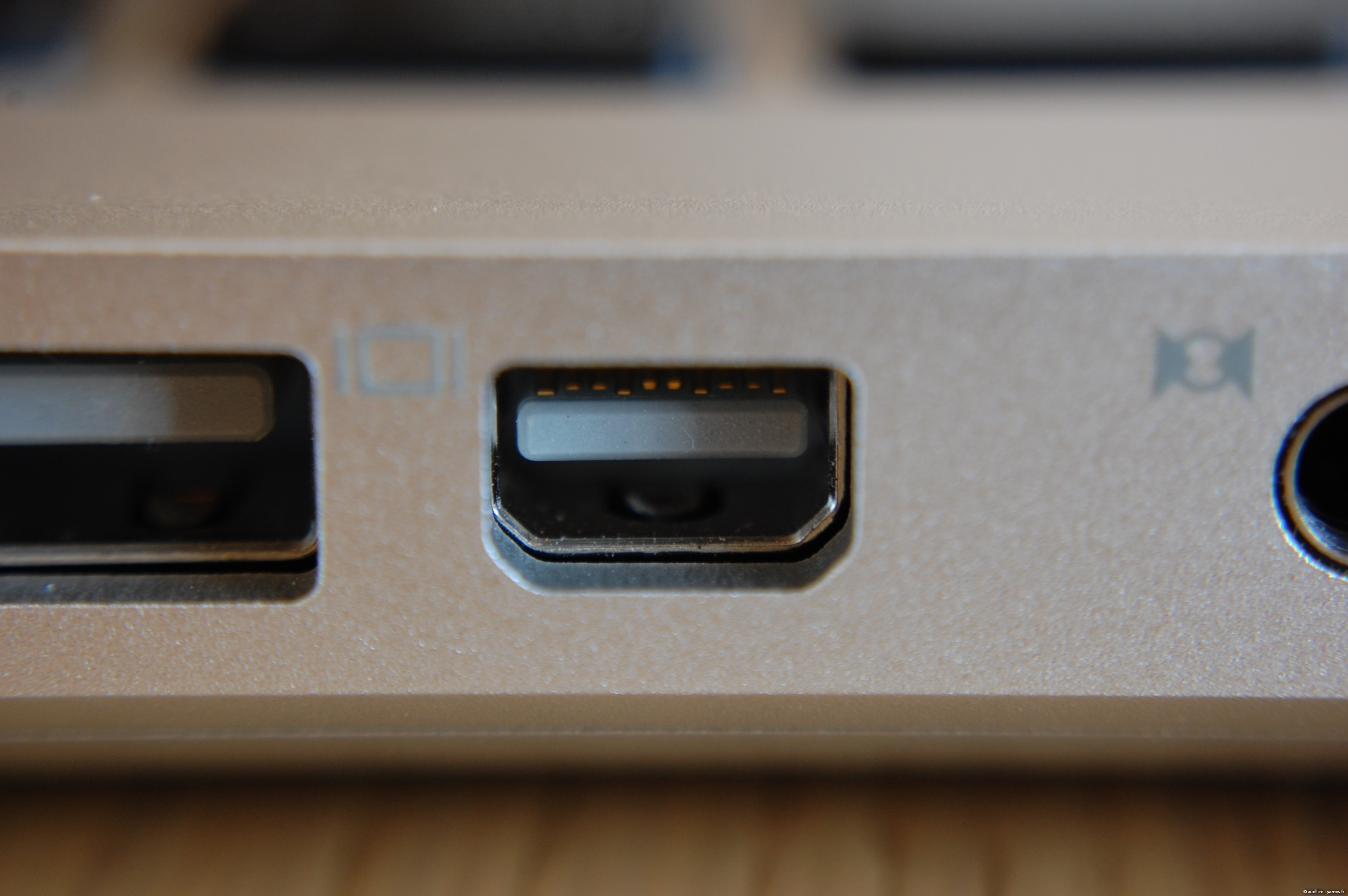
A Mini DisplayPort connector

Later in 2008, Apple introduced several products featuring a Mini DisplayPort. The new connector – proprietary at the time – eventually became part of the DisplayPort standard, however Apple reserves the right to void the license should the licensee "commence an action for patent infringement against Apple". In 2009, AMD followed suit with their Radeon HD 5000 series of graphics cards, which featured the Mini DisplayPort on the Eyefinity versions in the series.

Nvidia launched a graphics card with 8 Mini DisplayPort outputs on 4 November 2015, called the NVS 810, which was intended for digital signage.

Nvidia revealed the GeForce GTX 1080, the world's first graphics card with DisplayPort 1.4 support on 6 May 2016. AMD followed with the Radeon RX 480 to support DisplayPort 1.3/1.4 on 29 June 2016. The Radeon RX 400 series will support DisplayPort 1.3 HBR and HDR10, dropping the DVI connector(s) in the reference board design.

In February 2017, VESA and Qualcomm announced that DisplayPort Alt Mode video transport will be integrated into the Snapdragon 835 mobile chipset, which powers smartphones, VR/AR head-mounted displays, IP cameras, tablets and mobile PCs.

=== Support for DisplayPort Alternate Mode over USB-C ===
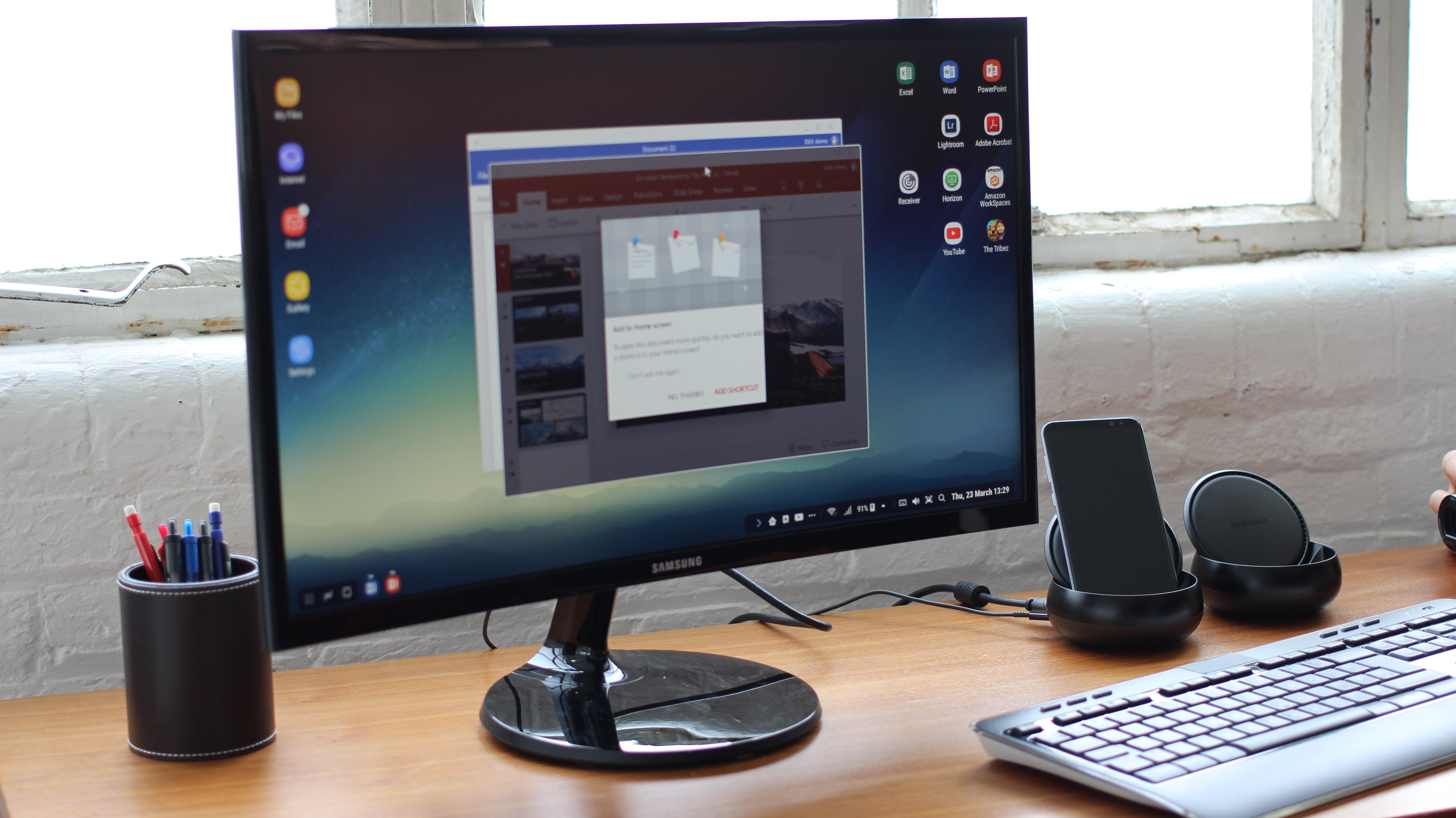
A Samsung Galaxy S8 plugged into a DeX docking station

Examples of devices that support DisplayPort Alternate Mode over USB-C include: MacBook, Chromebook Pixel, Surface Book 2, Samsung Galaxy Tab S4, iPad Pro (3rd generation), iPhone 15/15 Pro, HTC 10/U Ultra/U11/U12+, Huawei Mate 10/20/30, LG V20/V30/V40*/V50, OnePlus 7 and newer, ROG Phone, Samsung Galaxy S8 and newer, Nintendo Switch, Sony Xperia 1/5 etc.

== Participating companies ==
The following companies have participated in preparing the drafts of DisplayPort, eDP, iDP, DDM or DSC standards:

- Agilent
- Altera
- AMD Graphics Product Group
- Analogix
- Apple
- Astrodesign
- BenQ
- Broadcom Corporation
- Chi Mei Optoelectronics
- Chrontel
- Dell
- Display Labs
- Foxconn Electronics
- FuturePlus Systems
- Genesis Microchip
- Gigabyte Technology
- Hardent
- Hewlett-Packard
- Hosiden
- Hirose Electric Group
- Intel
- intoPIX
- I-PEX
- Integrated Device Technology
- JAE Electronics
- Kawasaki Microelectronics (K-Micro)
- Keysight Technologies
- Lenovo
- LG Display
- Luxtera
- Molex
- NEC
- NVIDIA
- NXP Semiconductors
- Xi3 Corporation
- Parade Technologies
- Realtek Semiconductor
- Rohde & Schwarz
- Samsung
- SMK
- STMicroelectronics
- Synaptics Inc.
- SyntheSys Research Inc.
- Teledyne LeCroy (QuantumData)
- Tektronix
- Texas Instruments
- TLi
- Tyco Electronics
- ViewSonic
- VTM

The following companies have additionally announced their intention to implement DisplayPort, eDP or iDP:

- Acer
- ASRock
- Biostar
- Chroma
- BlackBerry
- Circuit Assembly
- DataPro
- Eizo
- Fujitsu
- Hall Research Technologies
- ITE Tech.
- Matrox Graphics
- Micro-Star International
- MStar Semiconductor
- Novatek Microelectronics Corp.
- Palit Microsystems Ltd.
- Pioneer Corporation
- S3 Graphics
- Toshiba
- Philips
- Quantum Data
- Sparkle Computer
- Unigraf
- Xitrix

== See also ==
- GPMI
- HDBaseT
- List of video connectors
