= Display Control Channel =

Advanced on-screen display technology for KVM switches

Display Control Channel (DCC) is an advanced method of implementing on-screen display (OSD) technology on KVM switches. It was developed and patented by ConnectPRO, a company that has been providing KVM and networking solutions since 1992.

== Overview ==
Traditional OSD technology used on KVM switches displays control and selection functions, such as port selection and computer connection status, by overlaying this information on top of the selected channel's existing display. This method can result in inconsistent and unreliable image quality, as the size and positioning of the OSD depend on the video resolution of each connected system.

In contrast, KVM switches utilizing DCC technology display the configuration selection on a dedicated independent video channel. This approach offers several advantages:

- More secure and reliable quality of the controlling menu
- Consistent display regardless of connected systems' video resolutions
- Greater functionality and more programming possibilities

== Applications ==
DCC technology is specifically designed for use with KVM (Keyboard, Video, Mouse) switches, which allow users to control multiple computers from a single set of input devices. It is particularly useful in scenarios where high-quality display and control are crucial, such as in data centers, control rooms, or multi-computer workstations.

== Technology ownership ==
Display Control Channel is patented by ConnectPRO, a company that has been providing KVM and networking solutions since 1992.

== See also ==
- KVM switch
- On-screen display
- Display Data Channel
