= Monitor Control Command Set =

Communication protocols

Monitor Control Command Set or MCCS is a computer standard developed by Video Electronics Standards Association (VESA). It defines a binary protocol for controlling the properties of computer monitors from a host device such as PC, set-top box, etc.

MCCS requires a bidirectional communication protocol like Display Data Channel between host and display, although the specification does not favour any particular protocol.

== Controls ==
A virtual control panel (VCP) code is a binary code that represents a single command entity in the MCCS language. Each command contains variable number of data parameters and command attributes.

The following groups of controls are defined in the standard:

Factory preset
Commands for restoring factory defaults, as well as specifically restoring color, geometry, brightness/contrast, and TV settings defaults, and storing/restoring presets.
Color adjustment
Commands that control color temperature, hue, and saturation.
Geometry adjustment
Commands for adjusting CRT display geometry, such as parallelogram, pincushion, etc.
Image adjustment
Various general commands such as display orientation, degauss, gamma, zoom, focus, brightness/contrast, backlight control, etc. (Note: Note that MCCS glosses over the difference in how CRT and LCD or newer displays interpret brightness and contrast settings: adjusting LCD brightness affects overall luminance, which is the same as "contrast" on CRTs. LCD "contrast" instead adjusts the white level.)

It is possible to select the input source using a VCP command. Some monitors will only take VCP commands from the active input source, others will take commands from any connected input source.

Three categories of controls exist:

Continuous (C)
Allow values between zero and a maximum value.
Non-continuous (NC)
Only support a limited set of values.
Table (T)
Large blocks of data.

Control data may be read and write (RW), read-only (RO), or write-only (WO).

The display exposes its supported internal controls via capability strings.

== Versions ==
The original MCCS standard version 1 was released on September 11, 1998.

MCCS Version 2 was released on October 17, 2003. A major update of the standard, it provided support for flat panel displays, VESA DPVL (Digital Packet Video Link) standard; it added a range of television controls and introduced individual control of multiple windows on a display. New classes of VCP codes associated with asset management, secondary displays (for information, status, etc.) and remote program calls to the display processor are introduced.

MCCS Version 2, Revision 1 was released on May 28, 2005 and included some minor updates, as well as clarifications and improved usability of the standard.

MCCS Version 3, released on July 27, 2006, was a major revision and update which introduced significant changes, however this revision has seen very little support from the industry.

The latest release of V2 standard is version 2.2a, adopted January 2011.
