= VESA Display Power Management Signaling =

Standard for power management of computer monitors

VESA Display Power Management Signaling (VESA DPMS) is a standard from the VESA consortium for power management of video monitors. Example usage includes turning off, or putting the monitor into standby after a period of idle time to save power. Some commercial displays also incorporate this technology.

== History ==
VESA issued DPMS 1.0 in 1993, basing their work on the United States Environmental Protection Agency's (EPA) earlier Energy Star power management specifications. Subsequent revisions were included in future VESA BIOS Extensions.

== Design ==
The standard defines how to signal the H-sync and V-sync pins in a standard SVGA monitor to trigger the monitor's power saving capabilities.

DPMS defines four modes: normal, standby, suspended and off. When in the "off" state, some power may still be drawn in order to power indicator lights.

The standard is:

| State | H-sync | V-sync | Power | Recovery time |
|---|---|---|---|---|
| On | On | On | 100% | n/a |
| Stand-by | Off | On | < 80% | ~1 s |
| Suspend | On | Off | < 30 W | ~5 s |
| Off | Off | Off | < 8 W | ~20 s |

== Reception ==
By the late 1990s, most new monitors implemented at least one DPMS level.

DPMS does not define implementation details of its various power levels; while in a CRT-based display the three steps could logically be mapped to three blocks to be shut down in order of increasing savings, thermal stress, and warm-up time (video amplifier, deflection, filaments) not all designs would be trivially adaptable to this model, and neither would the technologies that commercially succeeded CRT monitors.

Partially due to this reason, most major operating environments (such as Microsoft Windows and the MacOS family) do not implement the 3-level DPMS specification either, offering only a single timer. Notable exceptions include X11 and the XFCE Power Manager.

DPMS competed with the alternative Nutek power saving system, in which the monitor recognizes a black picture produced by a screensaver and enters a power saving mode after an appropriate delay.

== See also ==
- Display Data Channel DDC
