= Remote graphics unit =

A diagram illustrating the RGU concept

A remote graphics unit (RGU) is a device that allows a computer to be separated from some input/output devices such as keyboard, mouse, speakers, and display monitors. The key part being remoted is the graphics sub-system of the computer.

== History ==
RGUs may have their origin with experiments with graphics controllers on mainframe computers in the 1970s. RGUs have been mostly associated with high end workstations running Unix-like operating systems or Windows since the late 1990s. Generally RGUs are used for special applications like remote sensing, financial services commodity trading desks, computer-aided design, etc.

Depending on how one chooses to define RGUs, dedicated X terminals may also be included.

== Application ==
Usually the reasons that might lie behind the desire to separate the user interface of a computer from the actual computer itself would be: securing computers away from users for corporate or government security, to reduce heat and noise in rooms with many computer operators, or to facilitate computer maintenance by placing all computers in very close proximity to one another.

== KVM interoperability ==
Unlike other technologies used to achieve this, such as KVM Extension (or Remote KVM) and DVI Extension for example, a remote graphics unit will effectively split a computer's PCI or PCI-Express bus and transmit only bus commands over to the user side.

With KVM Extension and DVI Extension, the graphics processing is done by a traditional graphics processing unit (GPU) on the computer side. Bus data is much smaller than rendered graphics data so the theory behind the remote graphics unit is that it is possible to achieve higher resolutions and better graphics performance when there is a large separation in distance between the user-side input/output devices and the computer side.

=== Examples ===
An example of a product line that was commercialized using RGU as the description of the technology is the Matrox Extio series. Extio is a brand that is marketing shorthand for "External I/O".

== Related products ==
Other products supporting the concept behind the remote graphics unit include bus extension technologies where a standard graphics processing unit is plugged into a remote PCI slot via a standard graphics add-in card. Various types of bus extension technologies are available including the DeTwo System from Amulet Hotkey as well as products from Avocent.
