= Micro stuttering =

Irregular frame delivery in computer graphics

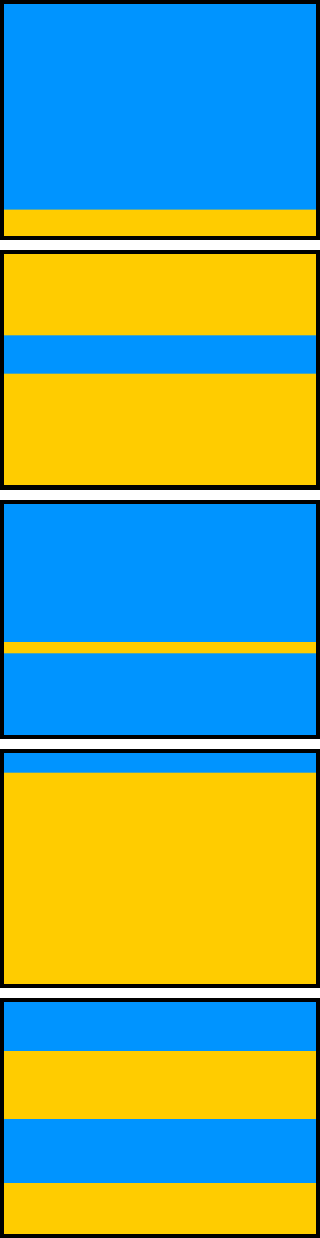
Five display refresh cycles showing a micro stuttering case. Each coloured section represents a GPU frame buffer; each colour change represents a buffer swap. At a 60 Hz refresh rate a benchmark tool might report 144 frames per second, but the viewer perceives fewer distinct frames because some exist for only a small fraction of a refresh cycle.

Micro stuttering is a visual artifact in real-time computer graphics in which the time intervals between consecutively displayed frames are uneven, even though the average frame rate reported by benchmarking software appears adequate. Tools such as 3DMark typically compute frame rates over intervals of one second or more, which can conceal momentary drops in the instantaneous frame rate that the viewer perceives as hitching or jerking of on-screen motion. (Note: The frame rate at which micro stuttering becomes perceptible varies with the application and the sensitivity of the viewer.)

At low frame rates the effect is visible as a stutter in moving images, degrading the experience in interactive applications such as video games. (Note: The threshold for a subjectively smooth experience varies by title and by user but is generally considered to be 30 to 60 frames per second or higher.) In severe cases a lower but more consistent frame rate can appear smoother than a higher but more erratic one.

The term gained prominence in the late 2000s in discussions of multi-GPU rendering (see History), but micro stuttering also affects single-GPU systems. Common causes on modern hardware include real-time shader compilation, asset streaming from storage, VRAM exhaustion, and driver bugs.

== Causes ==
=== Shader compilation ===
A common cause of micro stuttering on modern PCs is real-time shader compilation. Shaders are small programs that instruct the GPU on how to render visual effects such as lighting, shadows, and reflections. On consoles, developers can pre-compile all shaders for the known, fixed hardware. On PCs, the variety of GPU architectures means shaders must often be compiled at run time, either when the game launches or during gameplay itself.

When the rendering engine encounters a shader that has not yet been compiled, the CPU must finish the compilation before the GPU can draw the affected object. This causes a spike in frame time that the player perceives as a hitch. The problem has been particularly associated with games built on Unreal Engine 4 running under DirectX 12, because DX12 shifts more shader management responsibility to the application.

Several techniques exist to reduce shader compilation stutter. Pipeline State Object (PSO) pre-caching records the shader permutations used at runtime so that they can be compiled in advance on subsequent launches. Asynchronous shader compilation moves the work to background CPU threads to avoid blocking the main rendering thread. Platform-level services such as Steam's shader pre-caching distribute previously compiled shaders to users with matching GPU hardware. The Steam Deck, which contains a single fixed GPU, benefits from pre-compiled shader caches because all units share the same hardware configuration.

=== Other causes ===
Micro stuttering on single-GPU systems can have several additional causes. CPU bottlenecks or scheduling interruptions from background tasks can prevent the processor from preparing frames at regular intervals. Asset streaming during gameplay (loading textures, geometry, or audio from storage) can produce hitches sometimes called traversal stutter; the use of solid-state drives and technologies such as DirectStorage has reduced but not eliminated this. VRAM exhaustion forces data to be swapped between video memory and system memory over the PCI Express bus, which is slower. Graphics driver bugs can also introduce stutter; Nvidia released hotfix driver 551.46 in February 2024 to correct intermittent micro stuttering when V-Sync was enabled.

== Measurement ==
Micro stuttering drew attention to the limitations of average frame rate as a performance metric. In 2013, Scott Wasson at The Tech Report published a series of articles advocating frame time analysis, in which the delivery time of every individual frame is recorded and plotted rather than collapsed into a single frames-per-second figure. This approach was adopted by other hardware review publications in the following years.

GPU reviews now routinely report 1% low and 0.1% low frame rates alongside the average. The 1% low is the average frame rate of the slowest 1% of frames in a sample; it serves as an indicator of worst-case smoothness. A large gap between the average and the 1% low suggests poor frame pacing. Tools for capturing per-frame timing data include FRAPS, PresentMon, OCAT, CapFrameX, and MSI Afterburner with RivaTuner Statistics Server.

== Mitigation ==
=== Frame pacing ===
Frame pacing is a software technique that regulates the timing of frame delivery to produce even intervals between displayed frames. Game engines, GPU drivers, and platform libraries all implement frame pacing strategies to varying degrees. On mobile platforms, Google provides the Android Frame Pacing library (Swappy) as part of the Android Game Development Kit. In December 2025, the Khronos Group published the VK_EXT_present_timing Vulkan extension, giving developers explicit control over presentation timing in a cross-platform graphics API for the first time.

=== Variable refresh rate ===
Variable refresh rate (VRR) display technologies allow a monitor's refresh rate to change to match the GPU's frame output. Implementations include Nvidia G-Sync (2013), AMD FreeSync (2015), and the VESA Adaptive-Sync standard built into DisplayPort 1.2a and later. VRR eliminates the screen tearing that results from a mismatch between frame rate and refresh rate, and avoids the frame-holding behaviour of V-Sync that can itself cause stutter. It is effective at smoothing moderate frame rate fluctuations but cannot compensate for large sudden spikes in frame time such as those caused by shader compilation or heavy asset streaming. VRR support has become standard in gaming monitors, televisions (via HDMI 2.1), and the Xbox Series X/S and PlayStation 5 consoles.

=== Frame generation ===
Beginning with DLSS 3 on the GeForce RTX 40 series in 2022, Nvidia introduced AI-based frame generation, which uses dedicated optical flow hardware and a neural network to create new frames between traditionally rendered ones. AMD followed with FSR 3 in 2023, using an algorithmic approach, and the AI-based FSR 4 for the Radeon RX 9000 series in 2025. DLSS 4, released in January 2025 for the GeForce RTX 50 series, can generate up to three frames per rendered frame using a technique called Multi Frame Generation.

Frame generation increases the displayed frame rate but introduces its own frame pacing concerns. If the underlying rendered frames are unevenly timed, the interpolated frames can make the unevenness more apparent rather than less. DLSS 4 addresses this with hardware-level flip metering on the GPU's display engine, which controls the timing of frame presentation more precisely than the CPU-based pacing used in DLSS 3. Both vendors pair frame generation with latency-reduction features (Nvidia Reflex and AMD Anti-Lag+) to offset the additional input latency that results from inserting synthetic frames into the pipeline.

=== Frame rate limiters ===
Capping the frame rate below the display's maximum refresh rate, using tools such as RivaTuner Statistics Server, in-game limiters, or driver-level settings, is a common way to improve frame pacing. Preventing the GPU from running ahead of the display reduces variability in frame delivery times and can produce a smoother result than an uncapped but more irregular frame rate.

== History ==
=== Multi-GPU configurations ===
Micro stuttering was first widely documented in the late 2000s as a side effect of multi-GPU configurations using Alternate Frame Rendering (AFR), in which consecutive frames are assigned to alternating GPUs. Because each GPU may take a different amount of time to complete its assigned frame — due to varying scene complexity, driver scheduling, or inter-GPU communication overhead — the resulting frame delivery is irregular even when the average frame rate is high. Both Nvidia SLI and AMD CrossFireX were affected, with dual-GPU setups exhibiting the worst frame pacing irregularities. In 2012 benchmarks using Battlefield 3, dual Radeon HD 7970 cards in CrossFire showed 85% variation in frame delivery times compared with 7% for a single card, while dual GeForce GTX 680 cards in SLI showed only 7% variation compared with 5% for a single card.

Multi-GPU micro stuttering became a significant factor in the eventual decline and discontinuation of consumer multi-GPU gaming. Nvidia restricted SLI to a handful of enthusiast-class cards from the GeForce 10 series onward, then replaced it with NVLink on the GeForce RTX 20 series, which saw limited gaming adoption. AMD ceased active CrossFire development around 2017. By the mid-2020s, neither vendor's current consumer GPUs support multi-GPU rendering for games. Other factors that contributed to the decline include DirectX 12 placing multi-GPU support in the hands of game developers rather than driver authors, the incompatibility of temporal anti-aliasing and other temporal rendering techniques with AFR, and the increasing size, power draw, and cost of individual GPUs.

The third-party utility RadeonPro could reduce CrossFire micro stuttering through dynamic V-Sync and frame pacing adjustments, and AMD later introduced a driver-level frame pacing algorithm for multi-GPU DirectX 12 titles in 2016. Neither tool is actively used today.

== See also ==
- Alternate Frame Rendering
- Frame rate
- Frame time
- AMD FreeSync
- Graphics processing unit
- Jitter
- Nvidia G-Sync
- Screen tearing
- Shader
- Variable refresh rate
