= Framework Computer =

American computer company

Framework Computer, Inc.
- Type: Private
- Industry: Computer hardware
- Founded: January 2020; 6 years ago
- Founder: Nirav Patel
- Headquarters: San Francisco, California, United States
- Areas served: United States, Canada, European Union, United Kingdom, Australia, Taiwan, Norway, Switzerland, Singapore, New Zealand
- Key people: Nirav Patel (founder, CEO)
- Products: Desktop computers, laptops
- Website: frame.work

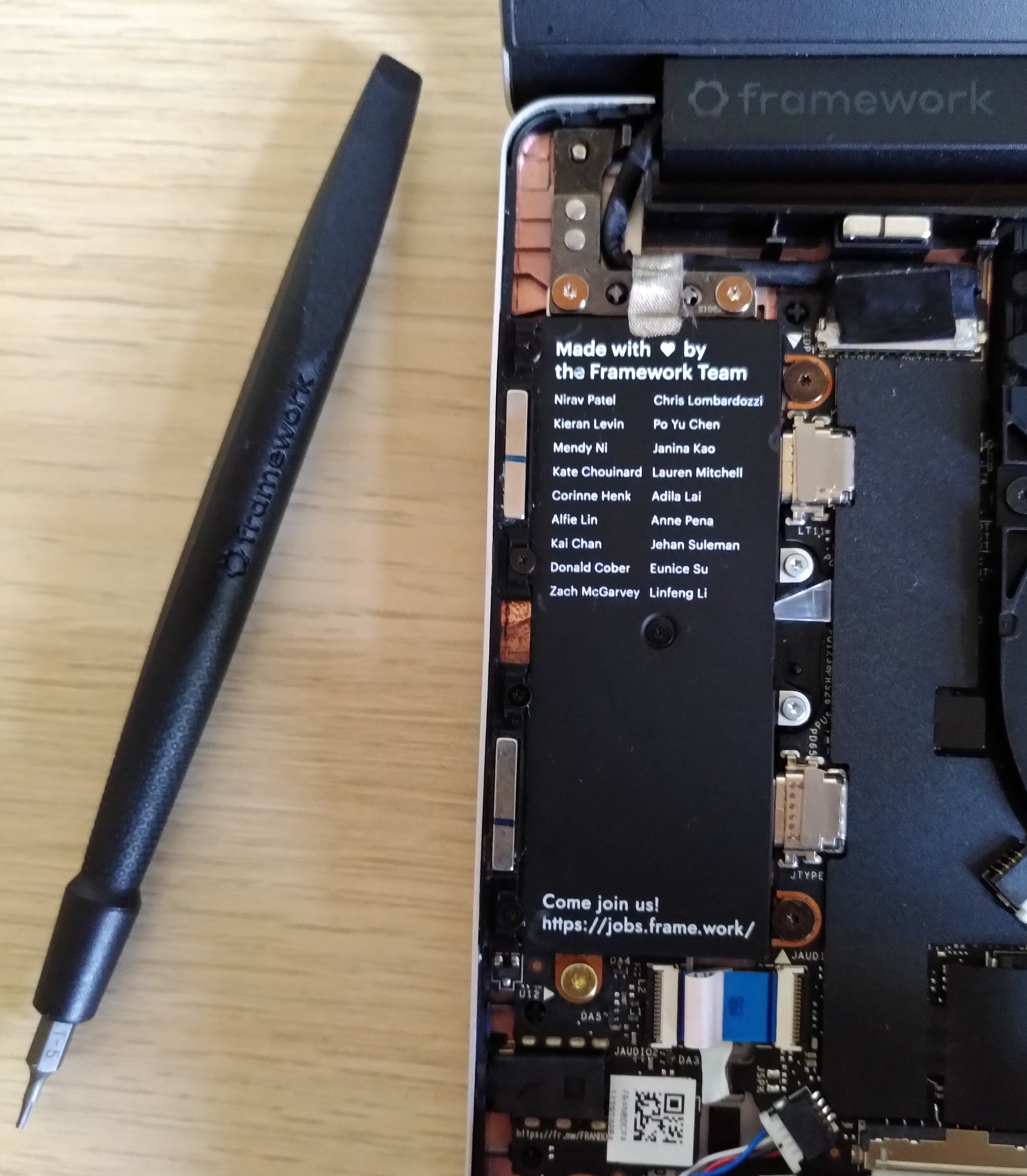
Framework team members' names printed on a part of the Framework Laptop

Framework Computer, Inc. is an American personal computer manufacturer, known for being a proponent of the right to repair movement. Their laptops are easily repairable, upgradable, and customizable with their modular first designs. Founded in 2020 by Nirav Patel, with an experienced team from other electronic companies, they launched their first product, the Framework Laptop 13, in late 2021. Since then, Framework has continued their promise of intergenerational upgradability while expanding their product line with different laptops and a desktop PC.

== History ==
In January 2020, the company was founded by Nirav Patel, who worked on software at Apple and later was the original Head of Hardware at Oculus.

In the first half of 2021, Framework was funded with a $9 million seed round.

In September 2021, YouTuber Linus Sebastian invested $225,000 in the company.

In January 2022, the company raised an additional $18 million of financing in a series A round, led by Spark Capital.

In April 2024, the company raised an additional $17 million of financing in a series A-1 round, led by Spark Capital, with Buckley Ventures, Anzu Partners, Cooler Master, and Pathbreaker Ventures. In addition to the $17 million, the company is opening up $1 million to equity crowdfunding through $10,000 investments. The company announced its expansion into other areas of consumer electronics with this round.

In October 2025, the company promoted and sponsored some politically polarizing software projects, considered to be connected to the alt-right, among others.

In August 2026, the company disclosed that all customers had been affected by a data breach against a third party.

== Products ==
Framework works with an original design manufacturing (ODM) partner Compal Electronics to build its products.

=== Framework Laptop 13 ===
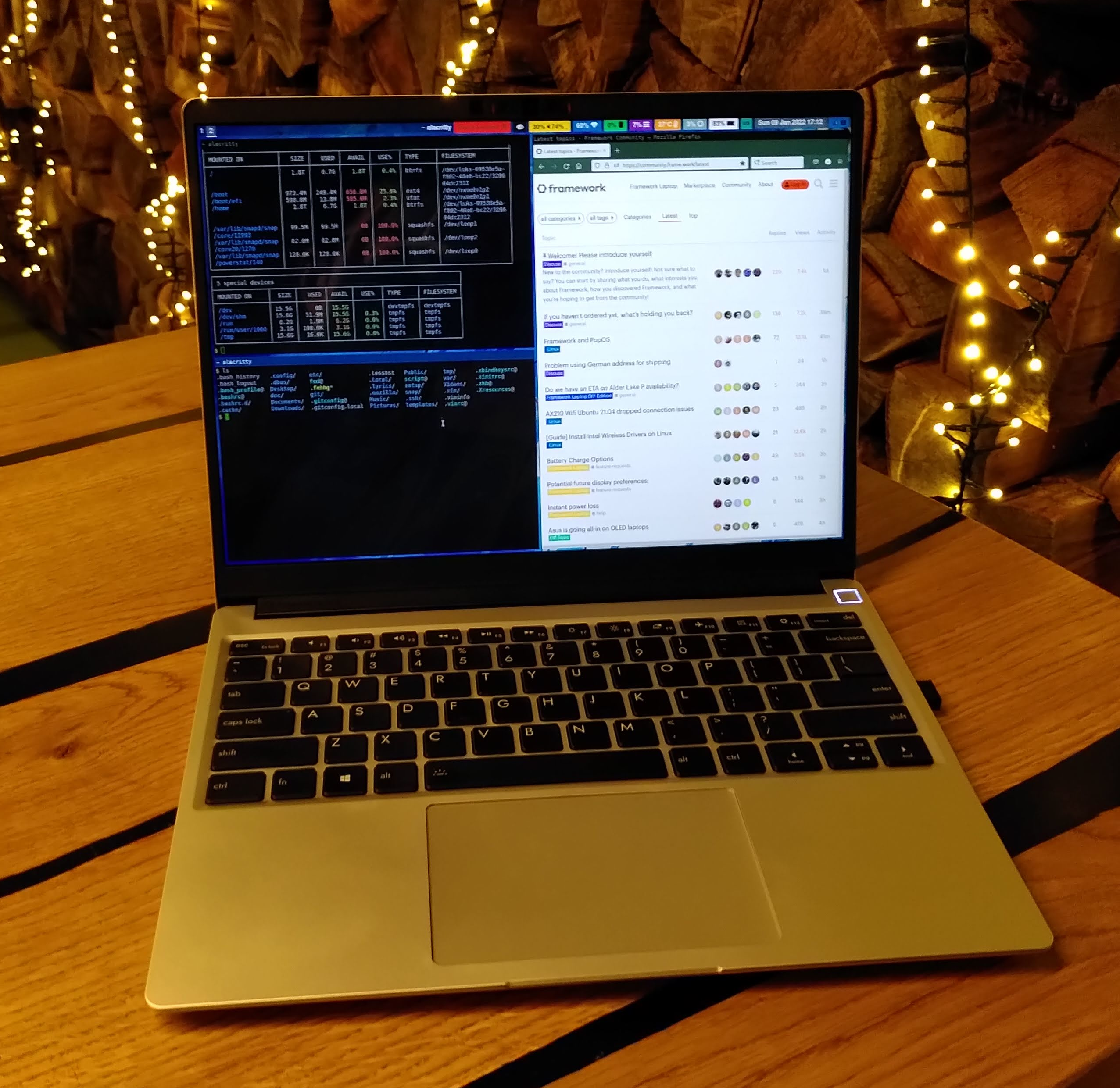
Framework Laptop displaying a web page

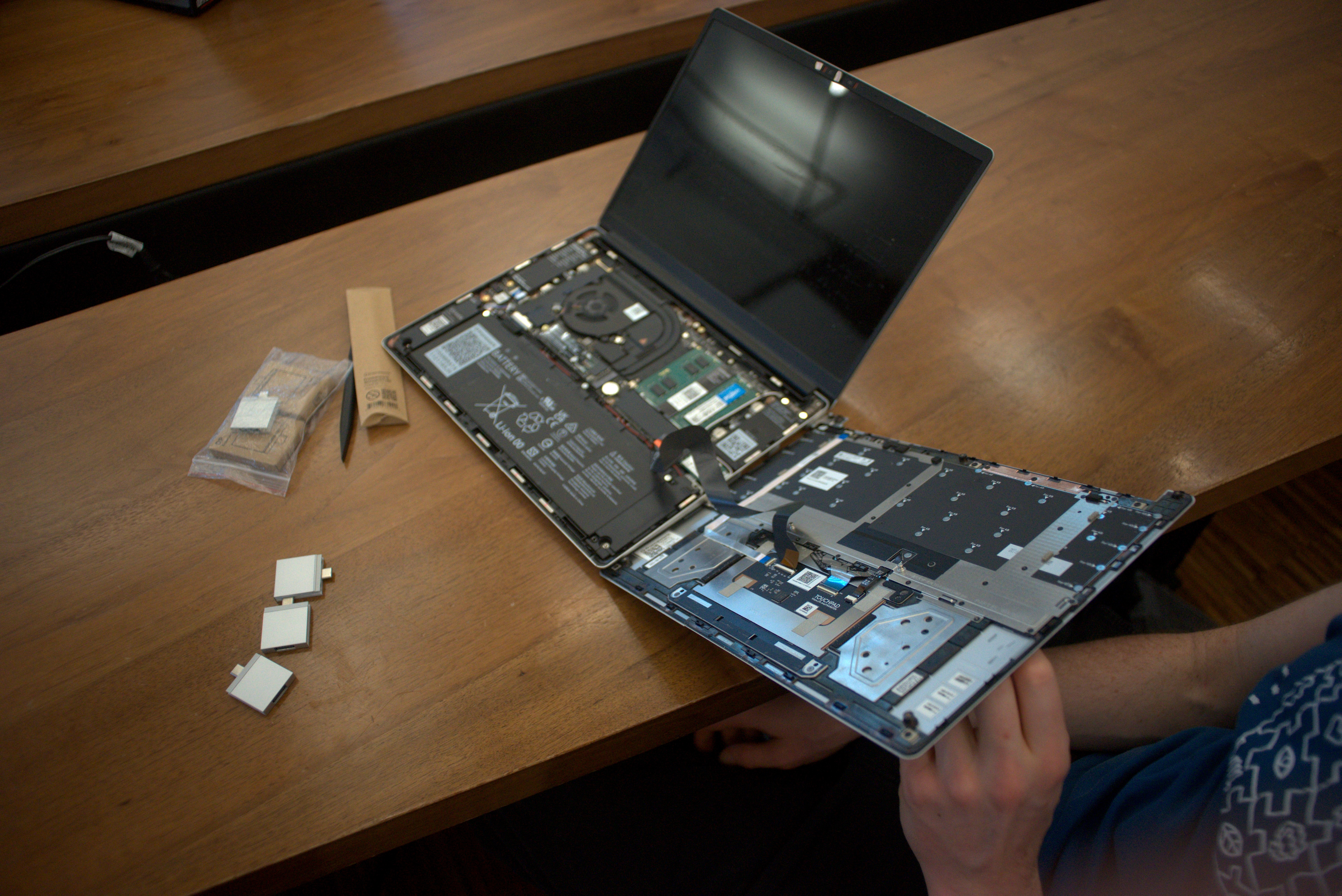
The internals of a Framework Laptop 13 can be accessed in less than a minute with a single screwdriver.

In July 2021, Framework began fulfillment of their first product, the Framework Laptop (retroactively the Framework Laptop 13), with an 11th Gen Intel Core i5 or i7 chip to the US and Canada. In December 2021, Framework opened pre-orders to the UK, Germany and France. In February 2022, pre-ordering became available for Ireland, Austria and The Netherlands.

The Framework Laptop received a 10 out of 10 in iFixit's repairability score. The standard Framework Laptop ships as a fully assembled laptop, while the Framework Laptop DIY Edition ships with the RAM, storage, operating system, and in 11th Gen, the WiFi module uninstalled. All of these modules can be ordered with the DIY edition for an additional fee, or left out and purchased separately.

In May 2022, the company launched their Framework Laptop with a 12th Gen Intel Core i5 or i7 chip that ships with an upgraded back panel, alongside their 12 Gen Upgrade Kit, to allow 11th Gen users to upgrade their laptops. In September 2022, pre-ordering became available for Australia.

In September 2022, the company launched a Chromebook edition based on their 12th Gen Intel model for $999. Unlike the standard laptop, the Chromebook's specification is fixed to an i5-1240P, 8 GB of RAM, and a 256 GB SSD, but it retains the same upgradability as the standard laptop. Framework claims that the Chromebook edition has upgraded speakers and batteries compared to the standard laptop, but the speakers were described as "muffled" by ZDnet and the battery life was rated as quite poor for a Chromebook by ZDnet, Engadget, and PCMag. The Chromebook was also criticized for its price.

In March 2023, the company announced their Framework Laptop featuring 13th Gen Intel Core and AMD Ryzen 7040 processors. The designation of Framework Laptop 13 was adopted to distinguish it from the concurrently announced Framework Laptop 16. During this same event, Framework announced a higher capacity 61 Wh battery, a matte display option, and a Cooler Master case to house Framework motherboards. The initial shipments of the AMD-based Framework laptops were delayed due to electrical and firmware related issues.

In May 2024, the company announced their Framework Laptop 13 featuring an Intel Core Ultra Series 1 processor.

In February 2025, the company announced their Framework Laptop 13 featuring AMD Ryzen AI 300 series as well as adding the improvements introduced with the Intel model. The upgraded model supports up to 96 GB of DDR5 memory and has a 2.8K 120 Hz IPS display. The design retains Framework's emphasis on modularity, ensuring that most parts are compatible with earlier releases. Pricing for the DIY edition starts at $899, pre-built systems start at $1,099.

==== Motherboard ====
In April 2022, the company partly open-sourced their motherboard with CAD and electrical documentation being available in their marketplace, giving away 100 motherboards to makers and developers.

There is an issue with the motherboards with 11th Gen Intel Core CPUs that requires complete removal and reconnection of both the main battery and the RTC coin cell battery if the laptop is not charged for a relatively short period of time. The company said that this issue is caused by the 11th Gen Intel Core silicon bug, and that they would work to swap out a replacement RTC coin cell battery or 11th Gen motherboard for the people facing the issue.

==== Firmware ====
Framework Laptop 13 uses proprietary UEFI firmware, InsydeH2O by Insyde Software, and an open-source embedded controller (EC) firmware based on CrOS EC by Framework. In April 2021, the company mentioned that open-source firmware was well-aligned to their mission. In January 2022, the company open-sourced their EC firmware. The company modifies the UEFI source code they bought from Insyde Software to meet their specific firmware needs. The company supports Linux Vendor Firmware Service (LVFS) to update the firmware. Framework Laptop Chromebook Edition uses an open source firmware, coreboot.

In April 2024, an article by Ars Technica described that the company had struggled with the other side of computing longevity and sustainability: providing up-to-date software. After that, the company published a blog article about software longevity, saying, "We recognize that we have fallen short of where we need to be on software updates, and we are making the needed investments to resolve this." A June 2025 follow-up evaluation acknowledged that the company had made progress in this regard.

==== Battery life ====
The initial 55 Wh battery in the original Intel 11th Gen CPU Model has been described as middling. This feedback was addressed with the release of a 61 Wh battery, available as an option in the 2023 edition of the laptop. An Ars Technica review found that the battery life of the 13th Gen Intel motherboard was significantly improved over prior designs, gaining a 40% uplift in PCMark's battery test but remaining mostly the same when running Handbrake, despite the reviewer testing battery life with the 55 Wh battery from their previous machine; with an upgrade to the 61 Wh battery, the runtime improved by another 13%.

The AMD Ryzen 7040U series option also showed additional battery life, better performance, less heat, and lower fan noise when idle, leading some to suggest that it rendered Intel models obsolete.

The battery drains even in a complete shut down state within UEFI version 3.07 or earlier with the 11th Intel Core motherboard, later fixed in UEFI unofficial version 3.08.

==== Technical specifications ====
As most components in Framework products are designed to be reconfigurable, this table lists stock specifications available at the time of purchase.

Specifications of Framework Laptop 13
Model		Framework Laptop 13						Chromebook
Model		Intel 11th Gen	Intel 12th Gen	Intel 13th Gen	Intel Core Ultra Series 1	AMD Ryzen 7040	AMD Ryzen AI 300	Chromebook
Timeline	Announced	February 2021	May 2022	March 2023	May 2024	March 2023	February 2025	September 2022
Timeline	Released	July 2021	August 2022	May 2023	August 2024	October 2023	April 2025	November 2022
Timeline	Discontinued	Discontinued	Discontinued	Discontinued	Active	Active	Active	Discontinued
Motherboard	CPU	i5-1135G7 i7-1165G7 i7-1185G7	i5-1240P i7-1260P i7-1280P	i5-1340P i7-1360P i7-1370P	Ultra 5 125H; Ultra 7 155H; Ultra 7 165H	7640U; 7840U	340; 350; HX 370	i5-1240P
Motherboard	Graphics	Intel Iris Xe integrated graphics			Intel Arc integrated graphics	RDNA 3 integrated graphics	RDNA 3.5 integrated graphics	Intel Iris Xe integrated graphics
Motherboard	Memory type	DDR4-3200, 2 slots			DDR5-5600, 2 slots			DDR4-3200, 2 slots
Motherboard	Memory capacity	Up to 2×32 GB at time of purchase			Up to 2x48 GB at time of purchase			1x8 GB
Motherboard	Storage	1x M.2 2280; Up to 4 TB WD SN850X at time of purchase					1x M.2 2280; Up to 8 TB WD SN850X at time of purchase	256 GB NVMe
Motherboard	Storage	4× additional SSDs with Storage Expansion Cards						
Motherboard	Cooling	28 W rated dissipation, 2×5 mm heatpipe and 65 mm fan			30 W rated dissipation, 1x10 mm heatpipe and 65 mm fan			28 W rated dissipation, 2×5 mm heatpipe and 65 mm fan
Display	Type	LCD IPS						
Display	Size	285 mm × 190 mm, 13.5" diagonal						
Display	Resolution	2.2K Display: 2256 × 1504 (3:2); 2.8K Display: 2880 × 1920 (3:2)						
Display	Refresh rate	2.2K Display: 60 Hz; 2.8K Display: 60–120 Hz, VRR, FreeSync						
Display	SDR max brightness	2.2K Display: 400 nits 2.8K Display: 500 nits						
Display	HDR max brightness	—N/a						
Display	Full sRGB	Yes						
Display	Wide color (P3)	No						
Display	Surface	Glossy	Anti-glare matte					Glossy
Input/Output	Interface	4× USB 10Gbps / Thunderbolt 4 with 100 W and DisplayPort 1.4	4× USB 10Gbps / Thunderbolt 4 with 100 W and DisplayPort 2.0			2× USB 40Gbps with 100 W and DisplayPort 1.4a 1× USB 10Gbps with 100 W and DisplayPort 1.4a 1× USB 10Gbps with 100 W	2× USB 40Gbps with 100 W and DisplayPort 2.0; 1× USB 10Gbps with 100 W and DisplayPort 2.0; 1× USB 10Gbps with 100 W and DisplayPort 1.4a	4× USB 10Gbps / Thunderbolt 4 with 100 W and DisplayPort 1.4
Input/Output	Ports	4× user-selectable Expansion Card slots 3.5 mm TRRS audio connector						
Input/Output	Input devices	Backlit 78-key Lite-On keyboard, 1.5 mm travel 115 mm × 76.6 mm touchpad						
Input/Output	Fingerprint reader	Yes						No
Input/Output	Video and audio	1080p webcam, 1/6", f/2 lens, 80° field of view Dual microphones Camera power LED and hardware power switches [gen 2 webcam module needed]						
Input/Output	Wireless	Intel AX201	Intel AX211	Intel AX210		AMD RZ616	AMD RZ717	Intel AX201
Input/Output	Wireless	Wi-Fi 6, Bluetooth 5.2	Wi-Fi 6E, Bluetooth 5.4			Wi-Fi 6E, Bluetooth 5.3	Wi-Fi 7, Bluetooth 5.4	Wi-Fi 6, Bluetooth 5.2
Input/Output	Speakers	Stereo 2 W speakers (original or 80 dB)						
Power	Battery	55 Wh		55 Wh; 61 Wh	61 Wh		55 Wh; 61 Wh	55 Wh
Power	Battery	80% capacity after 1000 charge-discharge cycles						
Power	Battery	Supports up to 100 W over USB PD						
Power	Included adapter	60 W USB-C GaN						
Dimensions		297 mm × 229 mm × 15.9 mm, 1.3 kg (2.9 lb)						
Operating system		Windows 11 pre-installed DIY edition: user-provided Windows or Linux						ChromeOS

=== Framework Laptop 13 Pro ===
The Framework Laptop 13 Pro is the redesigned version of the Framework Laptop 13 meant to be "the MacBook Pro for Linux users". The entire chassis is machined out of 6000 series aluminum alloy that only comes in a graphite anodization, with a silver option planned as a separate enclosure. The touchpad is haptic, moving away from the traditional mechanical hinged touchpad. The IPS display panel was custom-designed by Framework to feature a 3:2 aspect ratio, 2.8K (2880 x 1920), 30–120 Hz variable refresh rate with factory calibration to 100% sRGB. The battery capacity has been increased to 74 Wh. Combined with the LPCAMM2 memory and the new Intel Core Ultra Series 3 CPUs, Framework claims up to 20+ hours of battery life streaming video. It is also the company's first laptop to be officially certified for Ubuntu. Shipping was expected to start in late June, but was moved to late July due to issues during manufacturing.

=== Framework Laptop 16 ===
The Framework Laptop 16 is a larger laptop announced at the promotional Next Level event in March 2023. It has an expansion bay that can attach PCIe components such as a dedicated GPU, as well as adapt the laptop's cooling system, a fully customizable keyboard that can connect a numpad, and change the input modules, and 6 expansion card slots. In February 2024, Framework began fulfillment of the Framework Laptop 16, with an AMD Ryzen 7040 series processor.

In August 2025, Framework announced their Framework Laptop 16 featuring AMD Ryzen AI 300 series processor, adding an optional Nvidia GeForce RTX 5070 expansion bay GPU module, which is backwards compatible with the 2024 model; shipments were set to begin in November 2025, but later shipped in December 2025.

==== Expansion Bay ====
The expansion bay is a part which enables users to swap discrete GPUs, choosing the default shell, Nvidia GeForce RTX 5070 (8GB/12GB option), AMD Radeon 7700S discrete GPU, or a dual M.2 adapter.

==== Technical specifications ====
As most components in Framework products are designed to be reconfigurable, this table lists stock specifications available at the time of purchase.

Specifications of Framework Laptop 16
Model		AMD Ryzen 7040	AMD Ryzen AI 300
Timeline	Announced	March 2023	August 2025
Timeline	Released	Planned to ship Q4 2023. Started shipping February 2024	Planned to ship November 2025. Started shipping December 2025
Timeline	Discontinued	Active	Active
Motherboard	CPU	AMD Ryzen 7 7840HS; AMD Ryzen 9 7940HS	AMD Ryzen AI 7 350; AMD Ryzen AI 9 HX 370
Motherboard	Graphics	RDNA 3 integrated graphics, Internal MUX Switch; AMD Radeon RX 7700S Graphics Module with 8 GB of GDDR6 memory	RDNA 3.5 integrated graphics, Internal MUX Switch; AMD Radeon RX 7700S (2nd Gen) Graphics Module with 8 GB of GDDR6 memory Nvidia RTX 5070 Laptop Graphics Module with either 8 GB or 12GB of GDDR7 memory
Motherboard	Memory type	DDR5-5600, 2 slots	
Motherboard	Memory capacity	Up to 2×48 GB at time of purchase	Up to 2×48 GB at time of purchase
Motherboard	Storage	2× M.2 NVMe PCIe Gen4x4 (1x 2280, 1x 2230)	1× M.2 NVMe PCIe Gen4x4 (2280); 1× M.2 NVMe PCIe Gen4x2 (2230)
Motherboard	Storage	6× additional SSDs with Storage Expansion Cards; 2× M.2 NVMe SSDs with Dual M.2 Adapter Expansion Bay Module	
Motherboard	Cooling	Expansion Bay Shell: two 75mm x 8.2mm fans RX 7700S Graphics Module: two 75mm x 11.5mm fans	Expansion Bay Shell: two 75mm x 8.2mm fans, reduced noise RX 7700S Graphics Module (2nd Gen): two 75mm x 11.5mm fans, reduced noise RTX 5070 Graphics Module: two 75mm x 11.5mm fans
Display	Type	LCD	
Display	Size	16" diagonal	
Display	Resolution	2560 × 1600 (16:10)	
Display	Refresh rate	60–165 Hz, VRR, FreeSync, 9 ms rise + fall time	60–165 Hz, VRR, FreeSync, 9 ms rise + fall time G-Sync with Nvidia RTX 5070 Laptop graphics module and Display Kit (2nd Gen)
Display	SDR max brightness	500 nits	
Display	HDR max brightness	—N/a	
Display	Full sRGB	Yes	
Display	Wide color (P3)	Yes	
Display	Surface	anti-glare matte	
Input/Output	Interface	2× USB 40Gbps with 240 W and DisplayPort 2.0; 1× USB 10Gbps with 240 W and DisplayPort 2.0; 1× USB 10Gbps with 240 W 2× USB 10Gbps	2× USB 40Gbps with 240 W and DisplayPort 2.1; 1× USB 10Gbps with 240 W and DisplayPort 2.0; 1× USB 10Gbps with 240 W and DisplayPort 1.4a 2× USB 10Gbps
Input/Output	Ports	6× user-selectable Expansion Card slots	
Input/Output	Ports	1× USB 2.0 (Type-C) port with DisplayPort 2.0 routed to the dGPU module	1× USB 2.0 (Type-C) port with DisplayPort 2.0 routed to the dGPU module 240 W charging with Nvidia RTX 5070 Laptop graphics module
Input/Output	Fingerprint reader	Yes	
Input/Output	Video and audio	1080p webcam, 1/6", f/2 lens, 80° field of view Dual microphones Camera power LED and hardware power switches	[gen 2 webcam needed]
Input/Output	Wireless	AMD RZ616	
Input/Output	Wireless	Wi-Fi 6E, Bluetooth 5.2	
Input/Output	Speakers	1 W tweeters and 2 W woofers	
Power	Battery	85 Wh (80% capacity after 1000 charge-discharge cycles)	
Power	Battery	Supports up to 240 W over USB PD	
Power	Included adapter	180 W USB-C GaN	240 W USB-C GaN
Dimensions		18 mm thick without the graphics module or 21 mm thick with one	
Operating system		Windows 11 pre-installed DIY edition: user-provided Windows or Linux	

=== Framework Laptop 12 ===
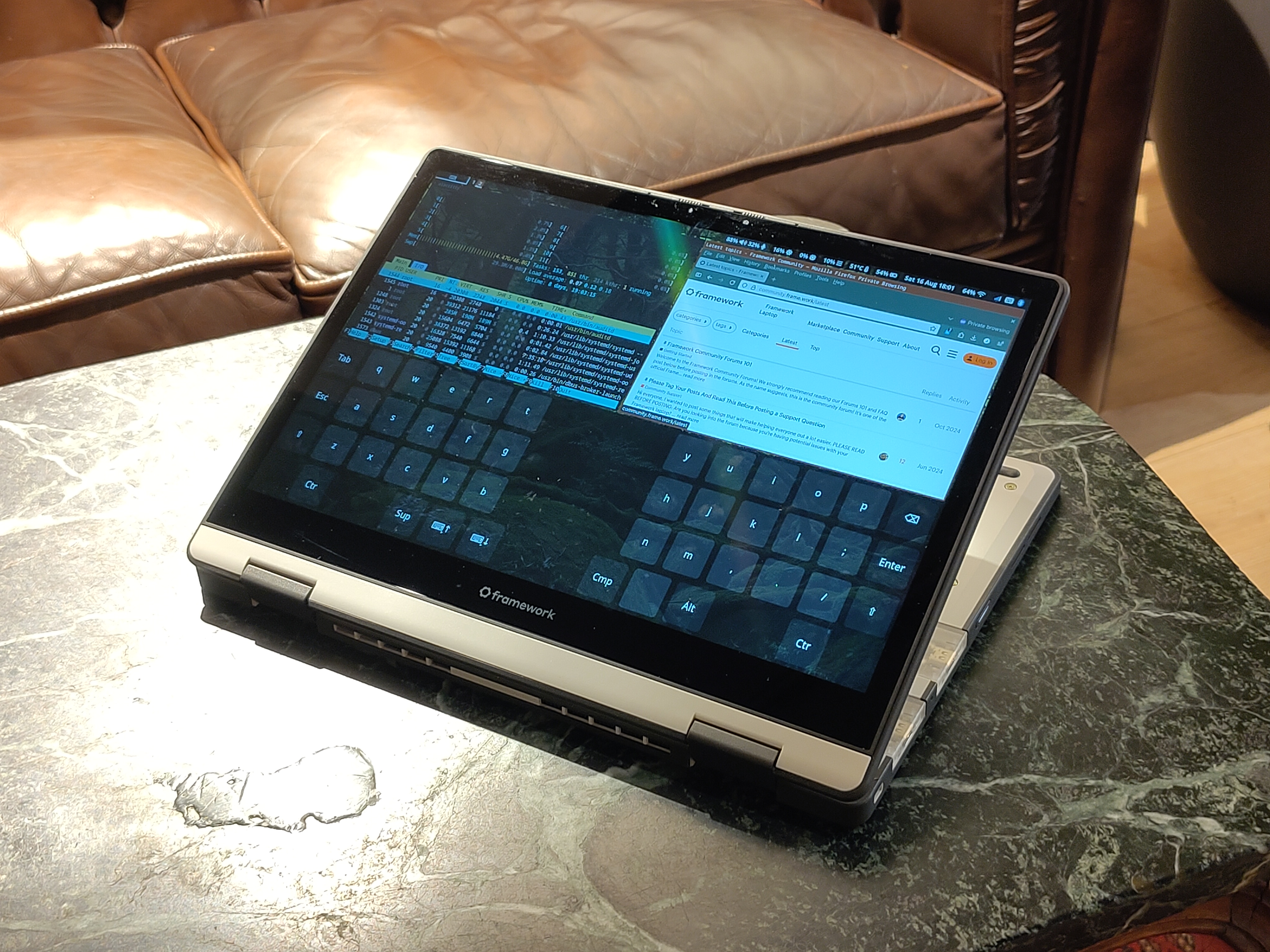
Framework Laptop 12 in tablet mode, displaying a website with a virtual keyboard

The Framework Laptop 12 is a 2-in-1 convertible laptop announced at the 2nd Gen event in February 2025. The Framework Laptop 12 is designated as a smaller, lower-cost model compared to the Framework Laptop 13 and 16 previously offered. It features a 12-inch WUXGA touchscreen, and it is compatible with MPP 2.0 and USI 2.0 stylus types. It has tablet mode. In June 2025, Framework began fulfillment of the Framework Laptop 12, with a 13th Gen Intel Core processor.

=== Framework Desktop ===
The Framework Desktop is a Mini-ITX workstation announced at the 2nd Gen event in February 2025, containing an AMD Strix Halo APU. The desktop is designed to be modular, containing two front-side expansion card slots as seen in its laptop models. The computer's front-side panel also has slots for 21 interchangeable tiles, allowing for users to customize the appearance of the machine.

Specifications of Framework Desktop
Model Specs		Max 385 - 32GB	Max+ 395 - 64GB	Max+ 395 - 128GB
Timeline	Announced	February 2025		
Timeline	Released	Pre orders opened 25 February 2025; Shipping Q3 2025		
Timeline	Discontinued	Active	Active	Active
Dimensions	Weight	3.1 kg		
Dimensions	Volume	4.5 L		
Dimensions	Size	W 96.8 x D 205.5 x H 226.1mm		
CPU	CPU Clock Base/Boost	3.6 GHz; 5.0 GHz	3.0 GHz; 5.1 GHz	
CPU	Cores/Threads	8C / 16T	16C / 32T	
CPU	L3 Cache	32 MB	64 MB	
GPU	iGPU	Radeon 8050S Graphics	Radeon 8060S Graphics	
GPU	Graphics Cores	32	40	
GPU	Frequency	2.8 GHz	2.9 GHz	
NPU	TOPS	50 TOPS		
Memory	Size	32 GB	64 GB	128 GB
Memory	Type	LPDDR5x-8000		
Memory	Bus Width	256 bit		
Memory	Bandwidth	256 GB/s		
Input/Output	Rear Ports	1× HDMI 2.1; 2× DisplayPort 2.1 up to UHBR10; 2× USB 40Gbps (Type-C) with DP 2.1 Alt Mode up to UHBR20; 2× USB 10Gbps (Type-A); 1× RJ45 5 GbE; 1× 3.5mm combo audio connector		
Input/Output	Expansion	2× User-selectable Expansion Cards USB 5Gbps; Configurable to USB 10Gbps in the UEFI		
Input/Output	Wireless	AMD RZ717		
Input/Output	Wireless	Wi-Fi 7, Bluetooth 5.4		

=== Expansion cards ===
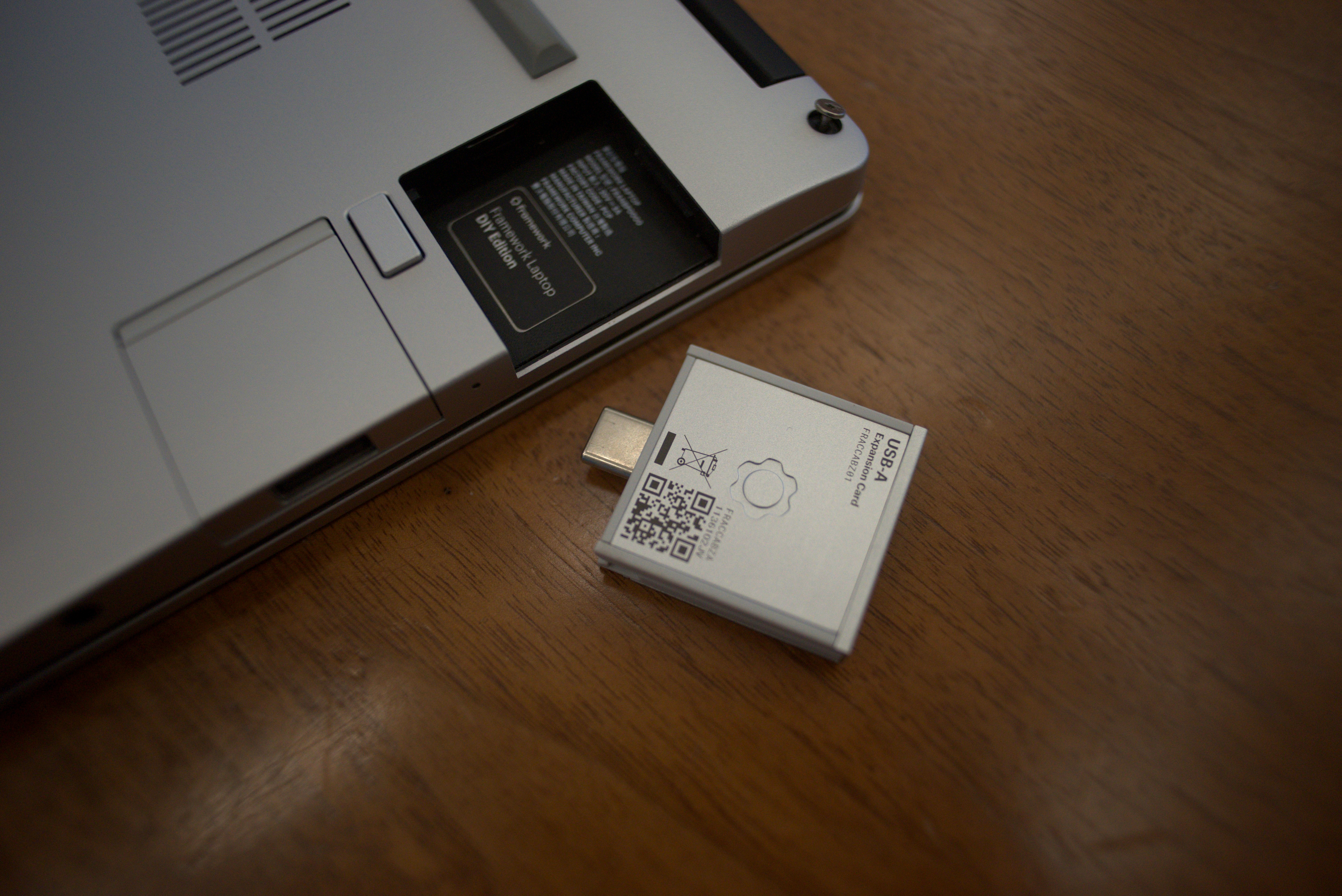
A USB-A expansion card and slot. Installing expansion cards takes seconds and requires no tools.

A core feature of the Framework laptop is the expansion card system that provides the primary input/output for the laptop. In its base form, the laptop is equipped with recessed slots containing USB-C ports that can be used directly. These slots can be attached with an assortment of interchangeable cards that add features such as USB-C (passthrough), USB-A, DisplayPort, HDMI, SD card, MicroSD, 2.5 Gigabit Ethernet, and 3.5 mm headphone jack, as well as form-fitting solid state storage (up to 1 TB per slot). The capabilities of the DisplayPort and HDMI expansion cards vary by the expansion card generation. The Framework Laptop 12 and Framework Laptop 13 can accommodate four expansion cards, and the larger Framework Laptop 16 accommodates six. The company launched the Expansion Card Developer Program to open card development to the public, releasing documentation, CAD templates, and reference designs for expansion cards—all under open source licenses.

==== USB-C ====
The capabilities of the USB-C expansion card are contingent on the mainboard, as it "passes through the supported protocols on the processor directly". Framework advertises capabilities of Thunderbolt 4/USB 40 Gbps, 48V/5 A (240 W) charging, and DisplayPort Alt Mode. On Intel platforms all slots perform the same while on AMD Ryzen platforms the capabilities vary depending on the slot the USB-C expansion card occupies.

== Marketplace ==
The Framework Marketplace is an online store service hosted on the Framework website that primarily sells parts and tools that can be used to upgrade and repair the Framework Laptop. These include, but are not limited to, replacement motherboards, batteries, entire screen assemblies, RAM, and storage drives. The Marketplace also sells customization parts, including screen bezels, keyboard layouts, and expansion cards. In addition to computer-related items, the Marketplace also includes merchandise. The marketplace is open to third-party vendors.

== Third party projects ==
As part of the company's efforts to accommodate hackers and computing enthusiasts, Framework released open-source reference designs, CAD models, and documentation of its laptops and components. Third-party companies and individuals have built various products based on Framework's specifications; these include, but are not limited to, vinyl skins and wraps, additional expansion cards to accommodate new features, and alternative housing for Framework mainboards.

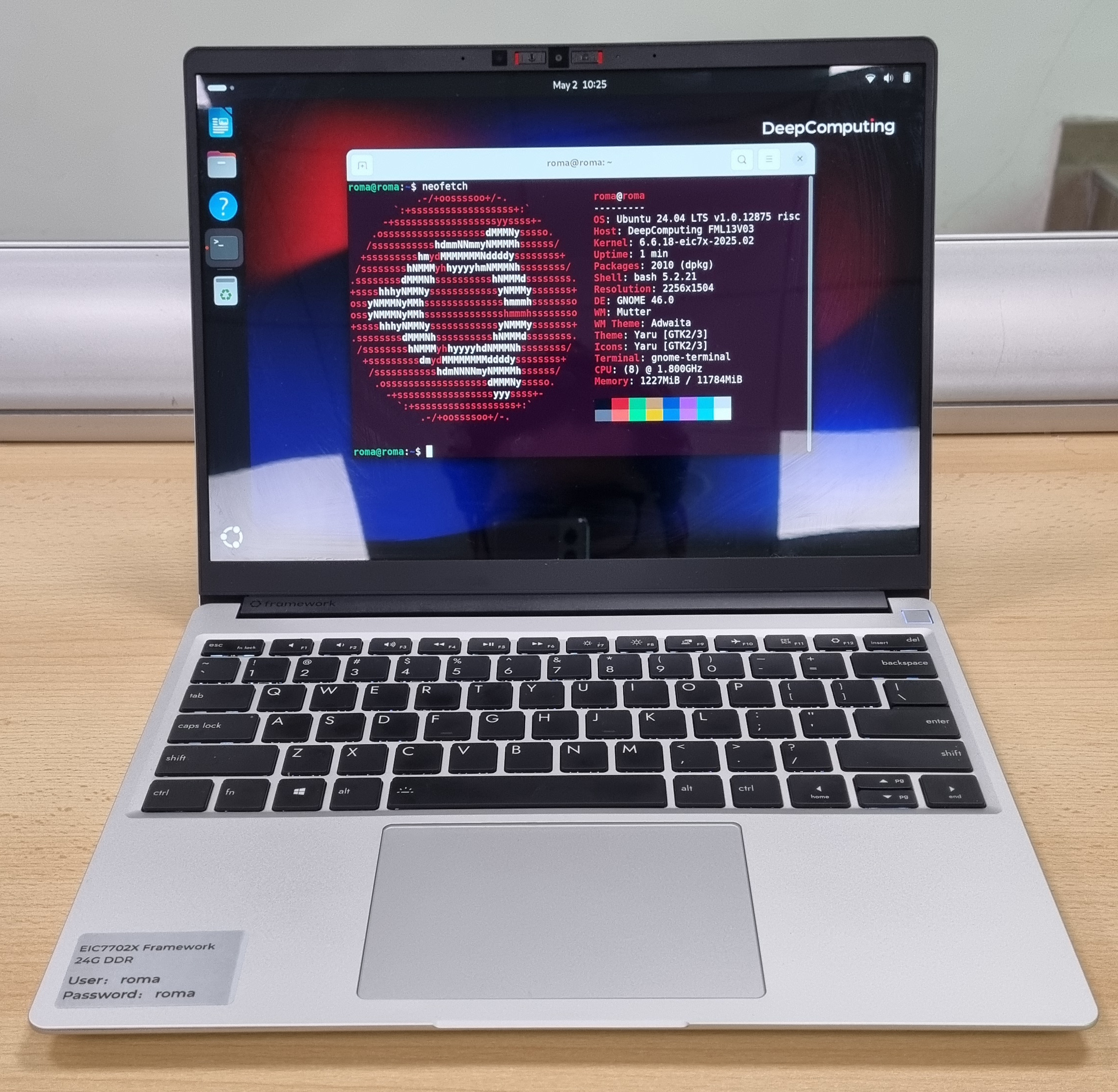
Framework Laptop 13 containing DC-ROMA RISC-V AI PC motherboard of DeepComputing running Ubuntu 24.04

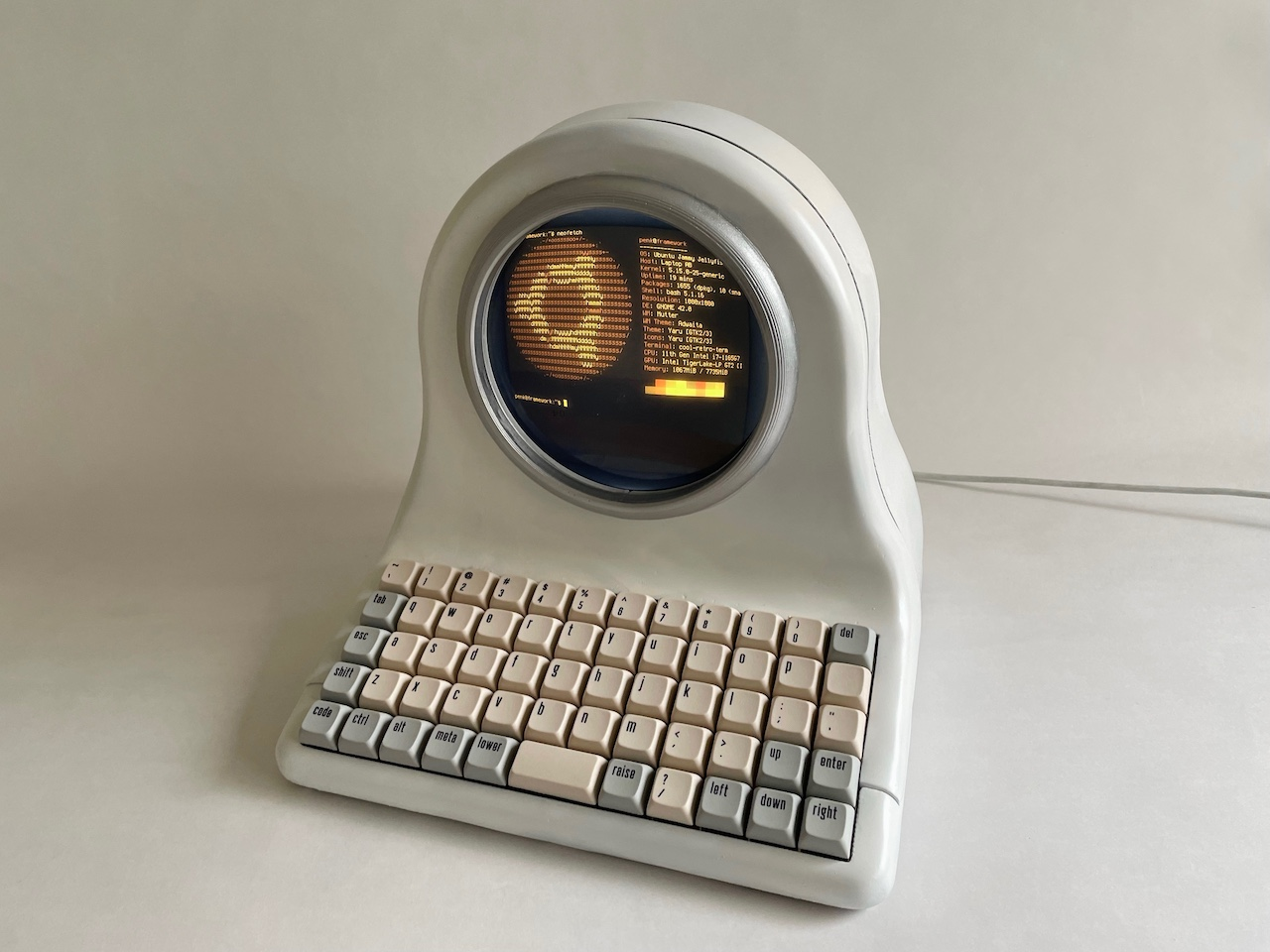
Mainboard Terminal, a retro-style round-display PC that uses the Framework's motherboard with Ubuntu

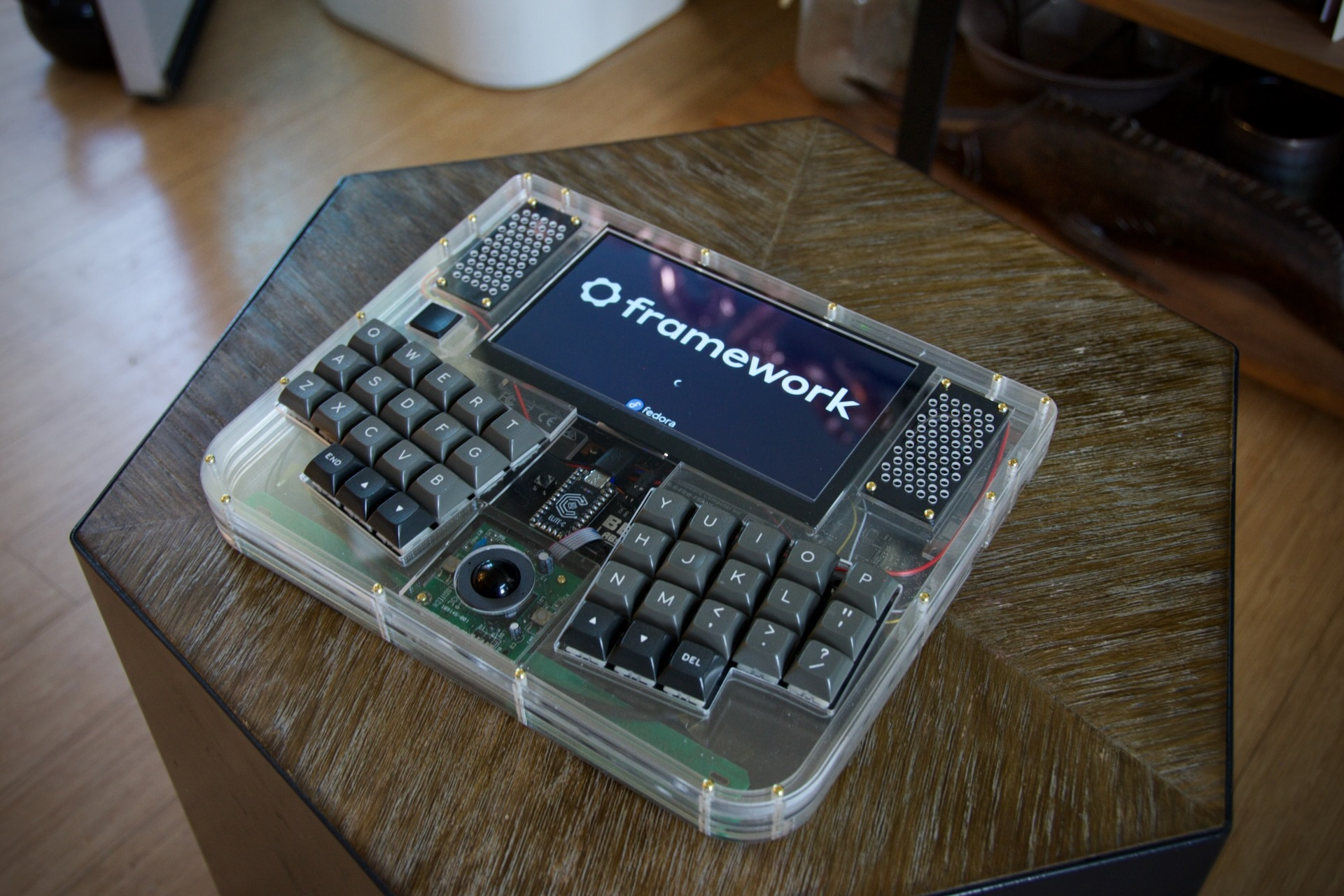
Framedeck, a Framework motherboard based cyberdeck with clear acrylic and brass influenced by TRS-80 Model 100

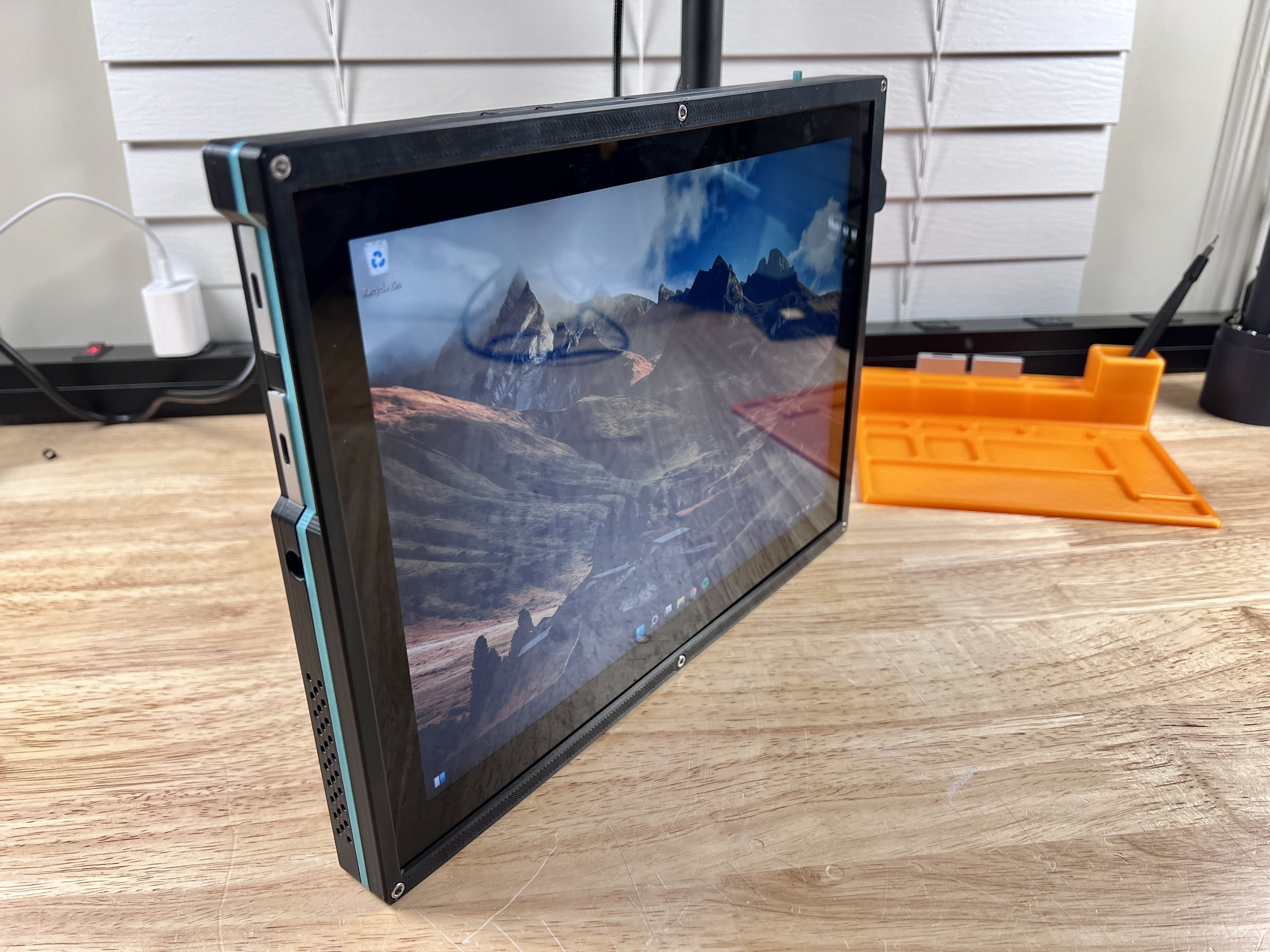
Framework-Tablet, a 3D-printable tablet case for Framework Laptop

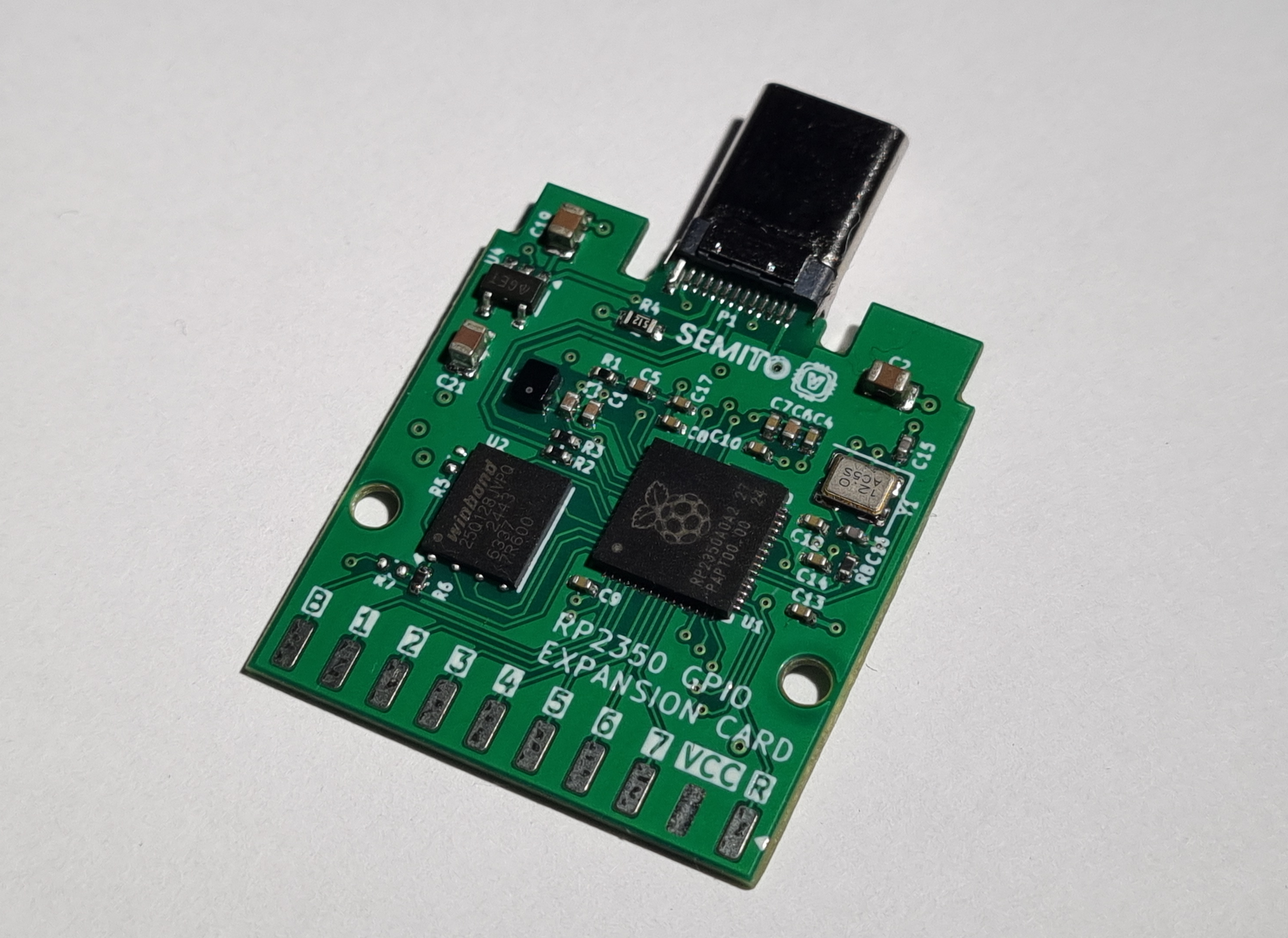
RP2350 based open source expansion card for Framework Laptop providing GPIO access to the computer

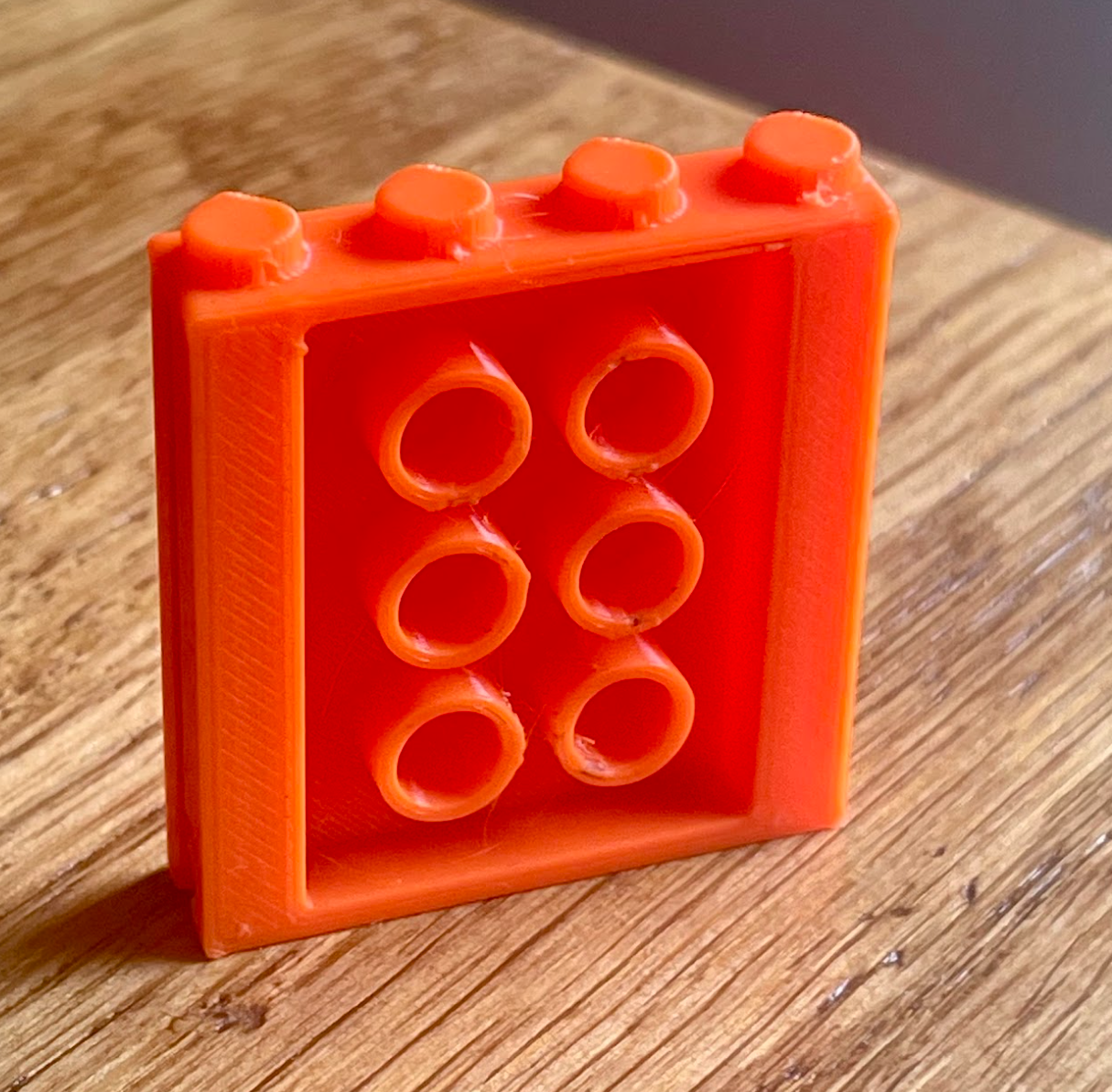
A custom 3D print of a brick system expansion card for Framework Laptop

Small 3D printed compartment expansion cards hold crackers and peanut butter. "SNACK Drawers" were the first commercially available third party expansion card.

== Product support ==
The company provides knowledge base articles, a community forum, QR codes on the products and parts, and an inquiry form.

=== Supported countries and regions ===
Framework Laptop is currently available for order in the United States, Canada, European Union, United Kingdom, Australia, Taiwan, Norway, Switzerland, Singapore and New Zealand.

In December 2021, the company announced that they chose the additional supported countries UK, Germany, and France based on both the number of people who registered interest through the region selection page and on logistical complexity. In February 2022, pre-ordering became available for Ireland, Austria, and the Netherlands. Pre-orders also opened in Australia in September 2022, with shipments arriving from October.

Framework does not support customers outside its supported regions, and does not endorse or support imported products.

=== Linux ===
In April 2022, the company announced their Linux compatibility page. In a July 2024 interview, a Linux support staffer mentioned, "My job is to identify the most likely distributions that we want to focus on providing support for efficiently and also then looking to outreach with community-based support as well ... and actually beginning to build those bridges."

By April 2026, the company said it was selling more of its 13 Pro laptops with Ubuntu configurations than Windows ones. Customers can still add Windows after the fact, but it is one of the few companies pre-loading its laptops with Linux already installed.

== Philosophy and recognition ==
=== Electronics right-to-repair movement ===
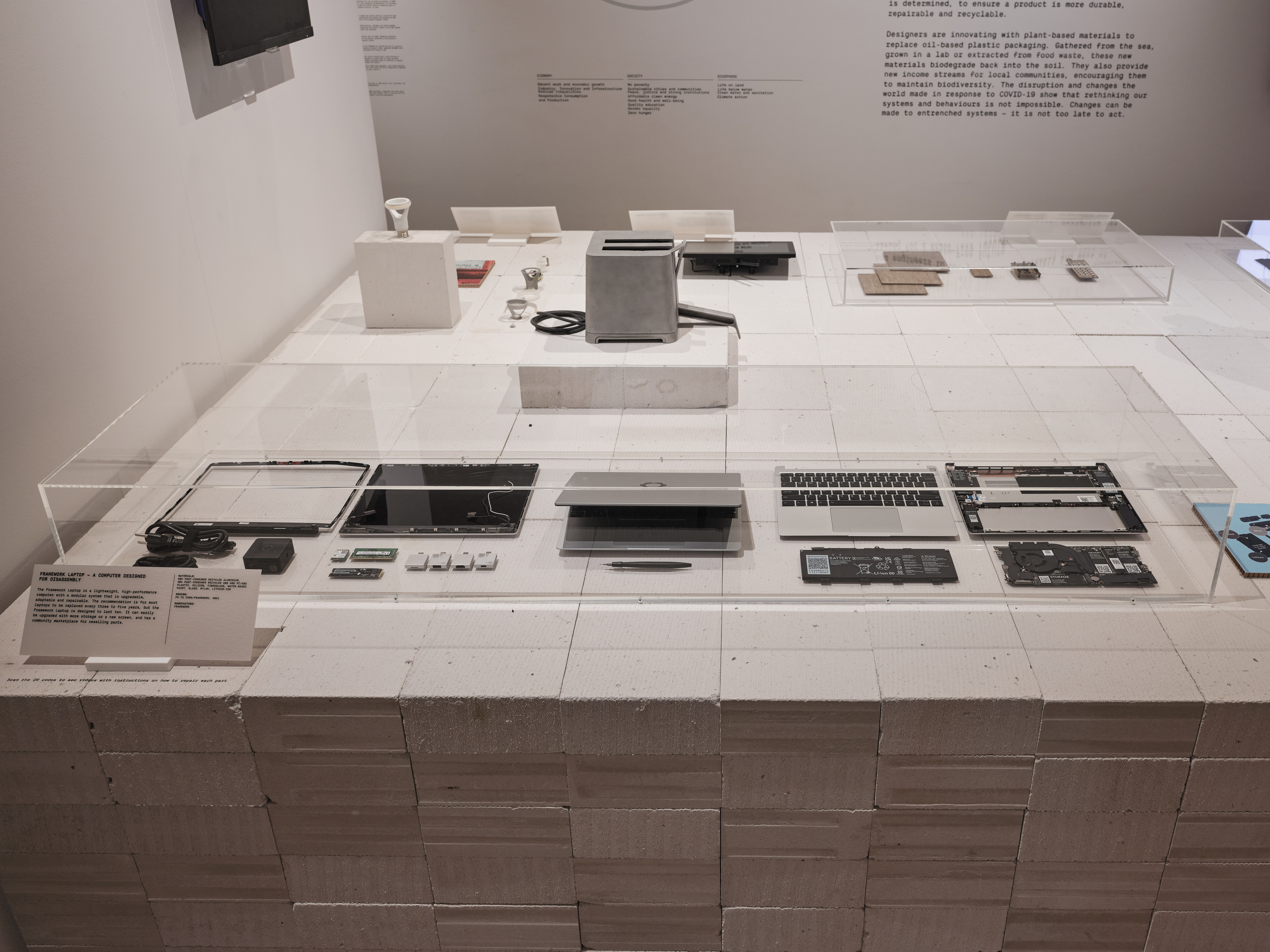
Disassembled Framework Laptop as part of the exhibition "Waste Age: What can design do?" at the Design Museum in London

In October 2021 interviews, the company said "The core problem is the idea that consumer electronics are disposable," and "Right to repair is incredibly important. It is actually a core part of what we are doing. Because increasingly products are not designed to be repaired."

Framework Laptop was on display as part of the Waste Age: What can Design Do? exhibition displayed at the Design Museum in London from October 2021 to February 2022.

The company's founder Nirav Patel appeared as a former employee of Apple in the Netflix original film Buy Now: The Shopping Conspiracy featuring shopping and waste, which was released in November 2024 ahead of Black Friday by Grain Media. He stated, "As soon as your business model starts to revolve around that replacement cycle, the object being replaced in a while instead of being something that can last longer, it becomes extremely difficult to reverse and go back".

=== Environment ===
In addition to the repairability and upgradability which reduces waste, the computers are partly made of recycled materials and the packaging is fully recyclable.

The computers are anodized without any dye to reduce the use of toxic chemicals, so they were only offered in aluminum gray. The Framework 13 Pro is the first one to be available in graphite color.

=== Reception ===
In November 2021, Time magazine listed the Framework Laptop on their list of the 100 Best Inventions of 2021. In March 2022, Fast Company listed the Framework Laptop on their list of the Most Innovative Companies of 2022. In October 2023, Time magazine listed the Framework Laptop 16 on their list of the 200 Best Inventions of 2023. In March 2026, Fast Company listed the Framework on their list of the Most Innovative Consumer Electronics Companies of 2026.

== See also ==
- Ethical consumerism
- Fairphone
- Shiftphone
- Social enterprise
- System76
- Purism
- Pine64
