= Alternate frame rendering =

Computer graphics technique using multiple GPUs

Alternate frame rendering (AFR) is a technique of graphics rendering in personal computers which combines the work output of two or more graphics processing units (GPU) for a single monitor, in order to improve image quality, or to accelerate the rendering performance. The technique is that one graphics processing unit computes all the odd video frames, the other renders the even frames. This technique is useful for generating 3D video sequences in real time, improving or filtering textured polygons and performing other computationally intensive tasks, typically associated with computer gaming, CAD and 3D modeling.

One disadvantage of AFR is a defect known as micro stuttering.

== Parallel rendering methods ==
AFR belongs to a class of parallel rendering methods, which subdivide a four-dimensional image frame sequence (x,y,z and time) into smaller regions, each of which is then assigned to a different physical processor within a multi-processor array. Note that the regional boundaries may be defined in space or in time. Also, the multiple processors can be implemented within a single video card or separate video graphics cards can be combined, subject to the motherboard and I/O slot limitations. When separate video cards are used, they must be specifically designed to allow a "cross-link" between them.

If a computer has two video cards that combine their outputs into a single video monitor, then one of four methods could be used to create the images.

- Alternate Frame Rendering (AFR): One graphics processing unit (GPU) computes all the odd video frames, the other renders the even frames. (i.e. time division)
- Split Frame Rendering (SFR): One GPU renders the top half of each video frame, the other does the bottom. (i.e. plane division)
- Checkerboard rendering: As the name implies, the image is split into smaller squares, which are assigned to different cards
- Scan-Line Interleave: The origin of the SLI trademark, as employed by the 3dfx Voodoo2, which renders a frame's even scan-lines on the first GPU and its odd scan-lines on the second. The SLI trademark passed to Nvidia upon its acquisition of 3dfx in 2000 and now stands for Scalable Link Interface.

== See also ==
- AMD CrossFireX
- NVIDIA SLI
