= Checkerboard rendering =

3D computer graphics rendering technique

Checkerboard rendering or sparse rendering, also known as checkerboarding for short, is a 3D computer graphics rendering technique, intended primarily to assist graphics processing units with rendering images at high resolutions. It is different from tiled rendering, a method of subdividing images to render them more efficiently, and from the "checkerboard" method of alternate frame rendering.

== Description ==
While exact implementations tend to vary between developers, the technique generally involves rendering only 50% of any given scene, often rendering it in a grid of 2×2 pixels. A reconstruction filter is then employed to extrapolate the appearance of the unrendered parts of the scene, with the final image then being presented to the viewer as (theoretically) the same as if it had been rendered natively at the target resolution. In some implementations the checkerboard grid will be alternated between frames, with the previous frame's image data being held in memory, and then used to aid with reconstructing the scene.

A similar technique was used in the 1993 video game Doom, which had a "low detail" mode that only rendered every other column of pixels to improve performance. Checkerboarding also bears a resemblance to interlaced video, where every frame is split into two fields, also halving the amount of pixels that has to be rendered or transferred. Checkboard rendering differs by splitting the image using the checkboard pattern instead of splitting it by alternate line. The reconstruction filter used in checkboard rendering is often more complex than the typical deinterlacing process.

Though the technique is usually employed with the goal of reducing the computational resources required to render a scene at higher resolutions, it can also be used as a form of anti-aliasing, with Rainbow Six: Siege being one of the games to use it in this manner.

== Implementation ==
Video games first started making use of the technique in the mid-2010s, often with the goal of making it easier for games to achieve 4K resolution at acceptable framerates. Though the technique does not require any specific hardware support outside of the normal for games produced in this era, the PlayStation 4 Pro included specialised hardware to enable checkerboard rendering to be carried out with much less of a performance loss than might otherwise be the case.

== See also ==
- Interlaced video
