= Scalable Link Interface =

Brand name; multi-GPU technology by Nvidia

- Manufacturer: Nvidia
- Type: Multi-GPU technology
- Released: 2004
- Discontinued: 2021
- Predecessor: Scan-Line Interleave
- Successor: NVLink

Scalable Link Interface (SLI) is the brand name for a now discontinued multi-GPU technology developed by Nvidia for linking two or more video cards together to produce a single output. The technology was invented and developed by 3dfx and later purchased by Nvidia during the acquisition of the company. SLI is a parallel processing algorithm for computer graphics, meant to increase the available processing power.

The initialism SLI was first used by 3dfx for Scan-Line Interleave, which was introduced to the consumer market in 1998 and used in the Voodoo2 line of video cards. Nvidia acquired the technology when it bought out 3dfx, but never used it. Nvidia later reintroduced the SLI name in 2004 and intended for it to be used in modern computer systems based on the PCI Express (PCIe) bus; however, the technology behind the name SLI has changed dramatically.

== Implementation ==
SLI allows two, three, or four graphics processing units (GPUs) to share the workload when rendering real-time 3D computer graphics. Ideally, identical GPUs are installed on the motherboard that contains enough PCI Express slots, set up in a master–slave configuration. All graphics cards are given an equal workload to render, but the final output of each card is sent to the master card via a connector called the SLI bridge. For example, in a two graphics card setup, the master works on the top half of the scene, the slave the bottom half. Once the slave is done, it sends its render to the master to combine into one image before sending it to the monitor.

The SLI bridge is used to reduce bandwidth constraints and send data between both graphics cards directly. It is possible to run SLI without using the bridge connector on a pair of low-end to mid-range graphics cards (e.g., 7100GS or 6600GT) with Nvidia's Forceware drivers 80.XX or later. Since these graphics cards do not use as much bandwidth, data can be relayed through just the chipsets on the motherboard. However, if there are two high-end graphics cards installed and the SLI bridge is omitted, the performance will suffer severely, as the chipset does not have enough bandwidth.

Configurations include:

- Two-way, three-way, and four-way SLI uses two, three, or four individual graphics cards respectively.
- Two GPUs on one graphics card. Examples include the GeForce GTX 590, the GeForce GTX 690 and the GeForce GTX Titan Z. This configuration has the advantage of implementing two-way SLI, while only occupying one PCI Express slot and (usually) two expansion I/O slots. This also allows for four-way SLI using only two cards (which is referred to as Quad SLI).

Nvidia has created a set of custom video game profiles in cooperation with video game publishers that will automatically enable SLI in the mode that gives the largest performance boost.

Nvidia has three types of SLI bridges:

- Standard bridge (400 MHz pixel clock and 1 GB/s bandwidth)
- LED bridge (540 MHz pixel clock)
- High-bandwidth bridge (650 MHz pixel clock and 2 GB/s bandwidth)

The standard bridge is traditionally included with motherboards that support SLI and is recommended for monitors up to 1920×1080 and 2560×1440 at 60 Hz. The LED bridge is sold by Nvidia, EVGA, and others and is recommended for monitors up to 2560×1440 at 120 Hz and above and 4K. The LED bridges can only function at the increased pixel clock if the GPU supports that clock. The high-bandwidth bridge is only sold by Nvidia and is recommended for monitors up to 5K and surround.

The following table provides an overview on the maximum theoretical bandwidth for data transfers depending on bridge type specifications as found on the open market:

Clock rate	400 MHz	540 MHz	650 MHz
Single channel	1 GB/s	1.35 GB/s	1.625 GB/s
Dual channel	2 GB/s	2.7 GB/s	3.25 GB/s

== SLI modes ==
=== Split-frame rendering (SFR) ===
This analyzes the rendered image in order to split the workload equally between the two GPUs. To do this, the frame is split horizontally in varying ratios depending on geometry. For example, in a scene where the top half of the frame is mostly empty sky, the dividing line will lower, balancing geometry workload between the two GPUs.

=== Alternate-frame rendering (AFR) ===
Each GPU renders entire frames in sequence. For example, in a two-way setup, one GPU renders the odd frames, the other the even frames, one after the other. Finished outputs are sent to the master for display. Ideally, this would result in the rendering time being cut by the number of GPUs available. In their advertising, Nvidia claims up to 1.9 times the performance of one card with the two-way setup. While AFR may produce higher overall framerates than SFR, it also exhibits the temporal artifact known as micro stuttering, which may affect frame rate perception. It is noteworthy that while the frequency at which frames arrive may be doubled, the time to produce the frame is not reduced – which means that AFR is not a viable method of reducing input lag.

=== SLI antialiasing ===
This is a standalone rendering mode that offers up to double the antialiasing performance by splitting the antialiasing workload between the two graphics cards, offering superior image quality. One GPU performs an antialiasing pattern which is slightly offset to the usual pattern (for example, slightly up and to the right), and the second GPU uses a pattern offset by an equal amount in the opposite direction (down and to the left). Compositing both the results gives higher image quality than is normally possible. This mode is not intended for higher frame rates, and can actually lower performance, but is instead intended for games which are not GPU-bound, offering a clearer image in place of better performance. When enabled, SLI antialiasing offers advanced antialiasing options: SLI 8×, SLI 16×, and SLI 32× (for quad SLI systems only).

=== Hybrid SLI ===
Hybrid SLI is the generic name for two technologies, GeForce Boost and HybridPower.

GeForce Boost allows the rendering power of an integrated graphics processor (IGP) and a discrete GPU to be combined in order to increase performance.

HybridPower, on the other hand, is another mode that is not for performance enhancement. The setup consists of an IGP as well as a GPU on MXM module. The IGP would assist the GPU to boost performance when the laptop is plugged to a power socket while the MXM module would be shut down when the laptop was unplugged from power socket to lower overall graphics power consumption. Hybrid SLI is also available on desktop Motherboards and PCs with PCI-E discrete video cards. NVIDIA claims that twice the performance can be achieved with a Hybrid SLI capable IGP motherboard and a GeForce 8400 GS video card.

HybridPower was later renamed as Nvidia Optimus.

== SLI HB ==
In May 2016 Nvidia announced that the GeForce 10 series would feature a new SLI HB (High Bandwidth) bridge; this bridge uses 2 SLI fingers on the PCB of each card and essentially doubles the available bandwidth between them. Only GeForce 10 series cards support SLI HB and only 2-way SLI is supported over this bridge for single-GPU cards. SLI HB interface runs at 650 MHz, while legacy SLI interface runs at slower 400 MHz.

Electrically there is little difference between the regular SLI bridge and the SLI HB bridge. It is similar to two regular bridges combined in one PCB. The signal quality of the bridge improved, however, as the SLI HB bridge has an adjusted trace-length to make sure all traces on the bridge have exactly the same length.

A PC gaming magazine did a comparison between SLI bridges and their SLI HB successors with X-rays, and found differences in the PCB tracing allowed clock rates to go up from 400 MHz to 650 MHz and thus the data rates along with that. With the increased bus width a noticeable bandwidth increase should be expected; however tests with a GTX 1080 GPU showed the improvements in gaming performance were marginal. Newer HB bridges are LED illuminated (often back-side-illuminating some logo) and as a result more costly than earlier bridges at a comparable base functionality.

== Caveats ==
- Not all motherboards with multiple PCI-Express x16 slots support SLI. On August 10, 2009, Nvidia announced that Intel and other leading motherboard manufacturers including ASUS, EVGA, Gigabyte and MSI have all licensed Nvidia SLI technology for inclusion on their Intel P55 Express Chipset-based motherboards designed for the upcoming Intel Core i7 and i5 processor in the LGA 1156 socket. Older motherboards using the P55's predecessors Intel P35 or Intel P45 do not support SLI.
  Recent motherboards as of October 2017 that support it are Intel's Z and X series chipsets (Z68, Z77, Z87, Z97, Z170, Z270, Z370, X79, X99 and X299) along with AMD's 990FX, X370 and X399 chipsets. Earlier chipsets, such as the Intel X58, could support 2-way SLI over 16 lane PCI-e. In order for motherboards of that generation to support more than two GPUs they were required to implement Nvidia nForce chipsets.
- In an SLI configuration, cards can be of mixed manufacturers, card model names, BIOS revisions or clock speeds. However, they must be of the same GPU series (e.g., 8600, 8800) and GPU model name (e.g., GT, GTS, GTX). There are rare exceptions for "mixed SLI" configurations on some cards that only have a matching core codename (e.g., G70, G73, G80, etc.), but this is otherwise not possible, and only happens when two matched cards differ only very slightly, an example being a differing amount of video memory, stream processors, or clockspeed. In this case, the slower/lesser card becomes dominant, and the other card matches. Another exception is the GTS 250, which can be paired with the 9800 GTX+, as the GTS 250 GPU is a rebadged 9800 GTX+ GPU.
- In cases where two cards are not identical, the faster card – or the card with more memory - will run at the speed of the slower card or disable its additional memory. (Note that while the FAQ still claims different memory size support, the support has been removed since revision 100.xx of Nvidia's Forceware driver suite.)
- SLI does not always give a performance benefit – in some extreme cases, it can lower the frame rate due to the particulars of an application's coding. This is also true for AMD's CrossFire, as the problem is inherent in multi-GPU systems. This is often witnessed when running an application at low resolutions.
- Vsync + Triple buffering is not supported in some cases in SLI AFR mode.
- Users having a Hybrid SLI setup must manually change modes between HybridPower and GeForce Boost, while automatically changing mode will not be available until future updates become available. Hybrid SLI supports only single link DVI at 1920×1200 screen resolution.
- When using SLI with AFR, the subjective framerate can often be lower than the framerate reported by benchmarking applications, and may even be poorer than the framerate of its single-GPU equivalent. This phenomenon is known as micro stuttering and also applies to CrossFire since it is inherent to multi-GPU configurations.
- With the new RTX 20xx series of graphics cards as launched in 2018 the interconnect is no longer SLI HB. These newer cards are using NVLink as its communication base and require either a three-slot-long or four-slot-long NVLink bridge - reasoned partially by thermal considerations and by socket availability. As of now only two GPU cards can be connected with NVLink; three-way, four-way and quad are not possible using NVLink bridges even if NVLink by principle is a very versatile interface.
- As of the GeForce RTX 30xx series, SLI has been effectively replaced with NVLink.

== Discontinuance ==
In 2020 Nvidia announced that they would no longer be adding new SLI driver profiles on RTX 2000 series and older, from January 1, 2021. It was possible for game developers to use DirectX 12 or Vulkan to introduce a multi-GPU setup without an SLI or CrossFire connection, but few developers supported the feature and with the increased graphical performance of newer video cards, multi-GPU setups for gaming were rendered obsolete by the early 2020s.

== See also ==
- MultiChrome
