= Scan-Line Interleave =

Multi-GPU technology by 3DFX

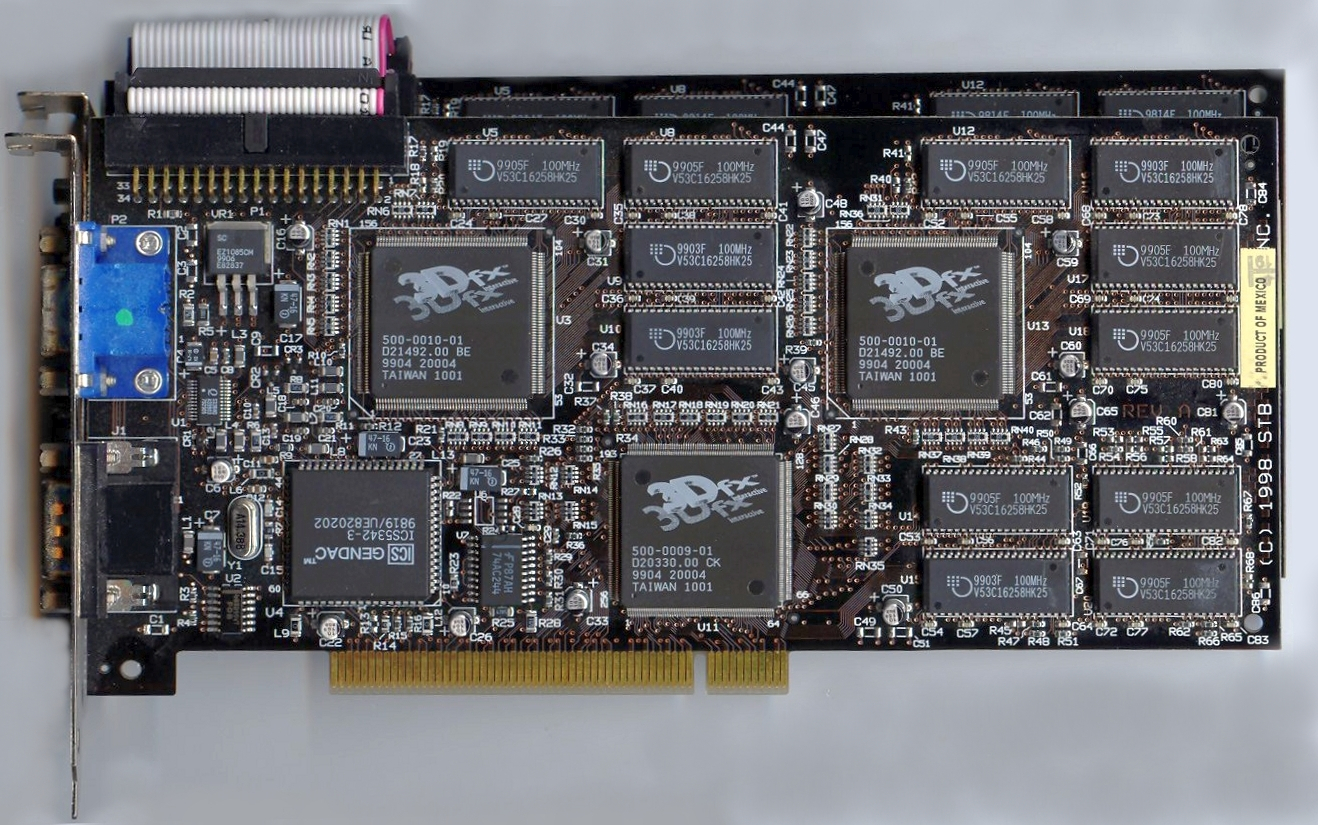
- Voodoo2 with SLI cable at top left
- Manufacturer: 3DFX
- Type: Multi-GPU technology
- Released: 1998
- Connectivity: Ribbon cable
- Successor: Scalable Link Interface

Scan-Line Interleave (SLI) is a multi-GPU method developed by 3DFX for linking two (or more) video cards or chips together to produce a single output. It is an application of parallel processing for computer graphics, meant to increase the processing power available for graphics.

3DFX's SLI technology was first introduced in 1998 with the Voodoo2 line of graphics accelerators. The original Voodoo Graphics card and the VSA-100 were also SLI-capable. However, in the case of the former, it was only used in arcades, as well as professional applications via Primary Image's Piranha card, intended for use with simulations using various graphics APIs such as OpenGL, Glide, or Primary Image's own Tempest API. Support for the MultiGen OpenFlight Format in particular was specifically advertised.

NVIDIA reintroduced the SLI initialism in 2004 as Scalable Link Interface. NVIDIA's SLI, compared to 3DFX's SLI, is modernized to use graphics cards interfaced over the PCI Express bus.

== Function ==
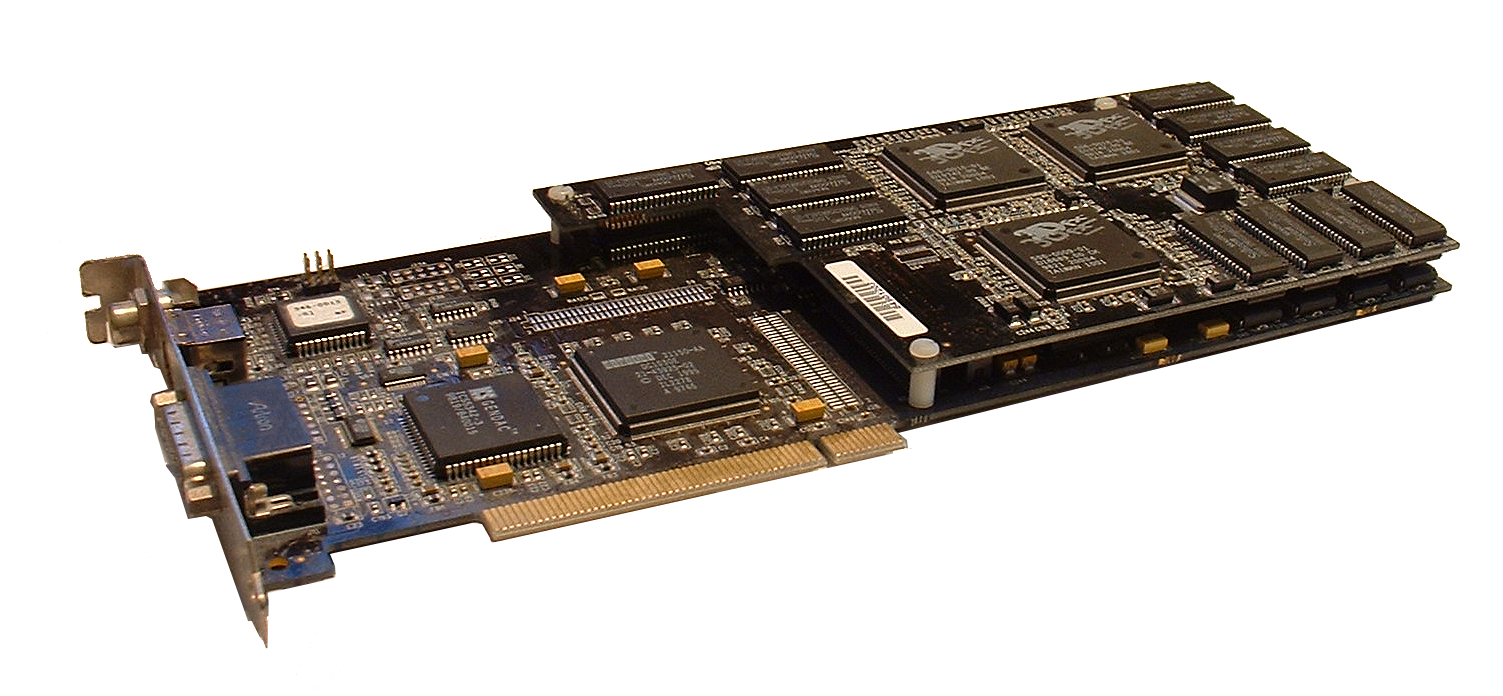
A single PCI video card from Quantum3D that combines two Voodoo2 boards in SLI configuration

3DFX's SLI design was the first attempt, in the consumer PC market, at combining the rendering power of two video cards. The two 3DFX cards were connected by a small ribbon cable inside the PC. This cable shared graphics and synchronization information between the cards. Each 3DFX card rendered alternating horizontal lines of pixels composing a frame.

== See also ==
- AMD CrossFireX
