= AMD FreeSync =

Display screen technology

- Original author: AMD
- Developer: AMD
- Release: 19 March 2015; 11 years ago
- Stable release: FreeSync 2.0 / 3 January 2017; 9 years ago
- Operating system: BSD, Linux, macOS, PlayStation 5, Windows, Xbox One, Xbox Series X/S
- Platform: DisplayPort, HDMI
- License: Open standard, royalty-free
- Website: https://www.amd.com/en/products/graphics/technologies/freesync.html

FreeSync is an adaptive synchronization technology that allows displays to support a variable refresh rate aimed at avoiding tearing and reducing stuttering caused by misalignment between the screen's refresh rate and the content's frame rate.

FreeSync was developed by AMD and first announced in 2014 to compete against Nvidia's proprietary G-Sync. It is royalty-free, free to use, and has no performance penalty.

== Overview ==
FreeSync dynamically adapts the display refresh rate to variable frame rates which result from irregular GPU load when rendering complex gaming content as well as the lower 23.97/24/29.97/30 Hz used by fixed video content. This helps remove stuttering delays caused by the video interface having to finish the current frame and screen tearing when starting a new frame in the middle of transmission (with vertical sync off). The range of refresh rates supported by the standard is based on the capabilities reported by the display. FreeSync can be enabled automatically by plug and play, making it transparent to the operating system and end user. FreeSync is not limited to only AMD graphics cards, FreeSync is also compatible with select Nvidia graphics cards and select consoles.

Transitions between different refresh rates are seamless and undetectable to the user. The sync mechanism keeps the video interface at the established pixel clock rate but dynamically adjusts the vertical blanking interval. The monitor keeps displaying the currently received image until a new frame is presented to the video card's frame buffer then transmission of the new image starts immediately. This simple mechanism provides low monitor latency and a smooth, virtually stutter-free viewing experience, with reduced implementation complexity for the timing controller (TCON) and display panel interface. It also helps improve battery life by reducing the refresh rate of the panel when not receiving new images.

=== Technology ===
The original FreeSync is based over DisplayPort 1.2a, using an optional feature that VESA terms Adaptive-Sync. This feature was in turn ported by AMD from a Panel-Self-Refresh (PSR) feature from Embedded DisplayPort 1.0, which allows panels to control its own refreshing intended for power-saving on laptops. AMD FreeSync is therefore a hardware–software solution that uses publicly-available protocols to enable smooth, tearing-free and low-latency gameplay.

FreeSync has also been implemented over HDMI 1.2+ as a protocol extension. HDMI 2.1+ also has its own native variable refresh rate system.

== FreeSync tiers ==
AMD FreeSync technology is split up into three tiers known as AMD FreeSync, AMD FreeSync Premium, and AMD FreeSync Premium Pro. AMD FreeSync requires the display to pass certification for low latency and refresh rate variation to match the render output of the graphics card.

AMD FreeSync Premium mandates further requirements of Low Framerate Compensation (LFC) and at least 120 Hz refresh rate at FHD resolution. LFC helps ensure that when the framerate of a game is running below the minimum supported refresh rate of a display, the frames are displayed multiple times so the framerate remains in the supported refresh rate of the display and smooth gameplay is maintained.

AMD FreeSync Premium Pro adds luminance and wide color gamut requirements.

=== FreeSync Premium Pro ===
In January 2017, AMD announced the second generation of FreeSync known as FreeSync 2 HDR. In January 2020, AMD Announced FreeSync 2 HDR was rebranding to FreeSync Premium Pro. Requirements include removing the minimal frame rate and setting a maximum on screen latency. FreeSync Premium Pro also doubles the color volume with support for wide color gamut color spaces and increased display brightness, enabling direct support of HDR-capable displays by video-card device driver and application software. Display's DisplayID/EDID metadata for color primaries and maximal/minimal luminances are used to adjust the tone mapping step when writing to the frame buffer, thus offloading color space and transfer-function processing from the OS color management and the video interface circuitry, which reduces output latency.

== FreeSync-compatible APUs and GPUs ==
All AMD GPUs starting with the 2nd iteration of Graphics Core Next support FreeSync.

Nvidia 10-series (Pascal) and newer GPUs with driver version 417.71 or higher support FreeSync.

Console APUs:

- AMD Durango APU in Microsoft Xbox One console. (FreeSync)
- AMD Edmonton APU in Microsoft Xbox One S console. (FreeSync Premium Pro previously known as FreeSync 2.0 with HDR)
- AMD Scorpio APU in Microsoft Xbox One X console. (FreeSync Premium Pro previously known as FreeSync 2.0 with HDR)
- AMD Lockhart APU in Microsoft Xbox Series S console. (FreeSync Premium Pro previously known as FreeSync 2.0 with HDR)
- AMD Scarlett APU in Microsoft Xbox Series X console. (FreeSync Premium Pro previously known as FreeSync 2.0 with HDR)

== See also ==
- Mantle
- Vulkan
- GPUOpen
- G-Sync
