= Variable refresh rate =

Dynamic display refresh rate that can continuously and seamlessly vary on the fly

Variable refresh rate (VRR) refers to a dynamic display that can continuously and seamlessly change its refresh rate without user input. A display supporting a variable refresh rate usually supports a specific range of refresh rates (e.g., 30 Hertz through 144 Hertz). This is called the VRR range. The refresh rate can continuously vary seamlessly anywhere within this range.

== Purpose ==
On displays with a fixed refresh rate, a frame can only be shown on the screen at specific intervals, evenly spaced apart. If a new frame is not ready when that interval arrives, then the old frame is held on screen until the next interval (judder) or a mixture of the old frame and the completed part of the new frame is shown simultaneously (tearing). Conversely, if the frame is ready before the interval arrives, then it won't be shown until that interval arrives.

Variable refresh rates eliminate these issues by matching the refresh rates of a display to be in sync with the frame rate from a video input, making the display motion smoother. Although VRR is strongly associated with video games due to such content having unpredictable, discontinuous frame rates that would benefit from the technology, it is also useful for media whose frame rate is fixed and known in advance, such as film and video. Being able to sync the refresh rate with industry-standard framerates (24, 25, 29.97, 30, 50, 59.94, and 60 FPS), it again helps to eliminate screen tearing. VRR is also used in power management by temporarily lowering a display's refresh rate during periods of little movement on the screen to save power.

== History ==
Vector displays had a variable refresh rate on their cathode-ray tube (CRT), depending on the number of vectors on the screen, since more vectors took more time to draw on the screen.

Since the 2010s, raster displays have gained several industry standards for variable refresh rates. Historically, there was only a limited selection of fixed refresh rates for common display modes.

Variable refresh rate was first incorporated into a display interface standard by VESA, which included Adaptive-Sync as an optional feature in the DisplayPort specification beginning in 2009. However, the feature was not formally introduced until the release of DisplayPort version 1.2a in 2014.

The first commercial implementation of VRR technology was Nvidia's G-Sync , which launched in 2014. The first display to support G-Sync was the ASUS VG248QE, which required users to purchase a separate $199 DIY upgrade kit to enable functionality.

== Implementations ==
Variable refresh rate display technologies include several industry standards and proprietary standards:

- AMD FreeSync
- Nvidia G-Sync
- DisplayPort 1.2a's optional Adaptive-Sync feature
- HDMI 2.1 Variable Refresh Rate (VRR)
- Apple ProMotion
- Qualcomm Q-Sync
