= Nvidia G-Sync =

Adaptive synchronization technology

G-Sync
- Original author: Nvidia
- Developer: Nvidia
- Release: 18 October 2013; 12 years ago
- Stable release: G-Sync Compatible (ongoing) / 6 January 2020; 6 years ago
- Operating system: BSD, Linux, Nintendo Switch 2, Windows
- Platform: DisplayPort, HDMI
- License: Proprietary
- Website: nvidia.com

G-Sync is a proprietary adaptive sync technology developed by Nvidia aimed primarily at eliminating screen tearing and the need for software alternatives such as Vsync. G-Sync eliminates screen tearing by allowing a video display's refresh rate to adapt to the frame rate of the outputting device (graphics card/integrated graphics) rather than the outputting device adapting to the display, which could traditionally be refreshed halfway through the process of a frame being output by the device, resulting in screen tearing, or two or more frames being shown at once. In order for a device to use G-Sync, it must contain a proprietary G-Sync module sold by Nvidia. AMD has released a similar technology for displays, called FreeSync, which has the same function as G-Sync yet is royalty-free.

Nvidia built a special collision avoidance feature to avoid the eventuality of a new frame being ready while a duplicate is being drawn on screen (something that could generate lag and/or stutter) in which case the module anticipates the refresh and waits for the next frame to be completed. Overdriving pixels also becomes tricky in a non-fixed refresh scenario, and solutions predicting when the next refresh is going to happen and accordingly adjusting the overdrive value must be implemented and tuned for each panel in order to avoid ghosting.

== Hardware ==
The module carries all the functional parts. It is based around an Altera Arria V GX family FPGA featuring 156K logic elements, 396 DSP blocks and 67 LVDS channels. It is produced on the TSMC 28LP process and paired with three DDR3L DRAM chips to attain a certain bandwidth, for an aggregate 768 MB capacity. The employed FPGA also features a LVDS interface to drive the monitor panel. It is meant to replace common scalers and be easily integrated by monitor manufacturers, who only have to take care of the power delivery circuit board and input connections.

GPU:

- Nvidia GeForce GTX 650 Ti Boost GPU or higher (G-Sync, G-Sync Ultimate)
- GeForce 10 series (Pascal) and above (G-Sync Compatible)

Driver:

- R340.52 or higher
- R417.71 or higher (G-Sync Compatible)

Operating system:

- Windows 7, 8, 8.1, 10 and 11
- Linux, FreeBSD, Solaris

System requirement:

- Must support DisplayPort 1.2 directly from the GPU (Displayport 1.2a for G-Sync Compatible)

Monitor:

- G-Sync monitor connected natively via DisplayPort v1.2 or higher (1.2a for G-Sync Compatible)

== Criticism ==
G-Sync faces some criticism due to its proprietary nature and the fact that it is still being promoted when free alternatives exist, such as the VESA standard Adaptive-Sync which is an optional feature of DisplayPort version 1.2a. While AMD's FreeSync relies on the above-mentioned optional component of DisplayPort 1.2a, G-Sync requires an Nvidia-made module in place of the usual scaler in the display in order for it to function properly with select Nvidia GeForce graphics cards, such as the ones from the GeForce 10 series (Pascal). However, there do exist G-Sync compatible monitors that can also utilize AMD's FreeSync. The G-Sync module itself has also been criticized for drawing power when the monitor is switched off, while comparable technologies don't draw any power when the monitor is switched off.

== List of G-Sync-enabled monitors ==
Brand	Model number	Release year	Resolution	Size	Refresh rate at native resolution	Panel technology
Acer	X34 Predator	2015	3440x1440	34	100 Hz	IPS
Acer	XB270H	2014	1920x1080	27"	144 Hz	TN
Acer	XB270HA	2014	1920x1080	27"	144 Hz	TN
Acer	XB280HK	2014	3840x2160	28"	60 Hz	TN
Acer	XB281HK	2015	3840x2160	28"	60 Hz	TN
Acer	XB271HK	2016	3840x2160	27"	60 Hz	IPS
Acer	XB321HK	2016	3840x2160	32"	60 Hz	IPS
Acer	XB240HA	2015	1920x1080	24"	144 Hz	TN
Acer	XB241H	2016	1920x1080	24"	144 Hz (180 Hz overclocked)	TN
Acer	XB241YU	2016	2560x1440	23.8"	144 Hz (165 Hz overclocked)	TN
Acer	XB252Q	2017	1920x1080	24.5"	240 Hz	TN
Acer	XB270HU	2015	2560x1440	27"	144 Hz	IPS (AHVA)
Acer	XB271HU	2016	2560x1440	27"	144 Hz (165 Hz overclocked)	IPS (AHVA)
Acer	XB271HUA	2016	2560x1440	27"	144 Hz (165 Hz overclocked)	TN
Acer	XB272	2017	1920x1080	27"	240 Hz	TN
Acer	X34	2015	3440x1440	34"	60 Hz (100 Hz overclocked)	IPS
Acer	Z271	2016	1920x1080	27"	144 Hz	VA
Acer	Z301C	2016	2560x1080	29.5"	144 Hz (200 Hz overclocked)	VA
Acer	Z35	2016	2560x1080	35"	144~200 Hz	VA
AOC	G2460PG	2014	1920x1080	24"	144 Hz	TN
AOC	AG271QG	2016	2560x1440	27"	165 Hz	IPS (AHVA)
AOC	AG271UG	2017	3840x2160	27"	60 Hz	IPS
AOC	AG352UCG	2017	3440x1440	35"	100 Hz	VA
Asus	PG348Q	2016	3440x1440	34"	100 Hz	IPS
Asus	PG278Q	2014	2560x1440	27"	144 Hz	TN
Asus	PG278QR	2016	2560x1440	27"	165 Hz	TN
Asus	PG279Q	2015	2560x1440	27"	144 Hz (165 Hz overclocked)	IPS (AHVA)
Asus	PG27AQ	2015	3840x2160	27"	60 Hz	IPS
Asus	PG27UQ	2018	3840x2160	27"	144 Hz	IPS (HDR)
Asus	PG248Q	2016	1920x1080	24"	144 Hz (180 Hz overclocked)	TN
Asus	PG258Q	2016	1920x1080	24.5"	240 Hz	TN
BenQ	XL2420G	2015	1920x1080	24"	144 Hz	TN
Dell	AW2721D	2020	2560x1440	27"	240 Hz	IPS
Dell	AW2725DM	2024	2560x1440	27"	165 Hz (180 Hz overclocked)	IPS
Dell	AW3418DW	2017	3440x1440	34"	100 Hz (120 Hz overclocked)	IPS
Dell	AW3418HW	2017	2560x1080	34"	144 Hz (160 Hz overclocked)	IPS
Dell	S2716DG	2016	2560x1440	27"	144 Hz	TN
Dell	S2417DG	2016	2560x1440	24"	144 Hz (165 Hz overclocked)	TN
Philips	272G5DYEB	2014	1920x1080	27"	144 Hz	TN
LG	32GK850G-B	2017	2560x1440	32"	144 Hz (165 Hz overclocked)	VA
LG	34UC89G-B	2017	2560x1080	34"	144 Hz (166 Hz overclocked)	IPS
ViewSonic	XG2703-GS	2016	2560x1440	27"	144 Hz (165 Hz overclocked)	IPS (AHVA)
HP	OMEN X Emperium 65	2019	3840x2160	64.5"	144 Hz	VA
Acer	X35	2019	3440x1440	35"	180 Hz (200 Hz overclocked)	VA

== List of upcoming G-Sync-enabled monitors ==
Brand	Model number	Resolution	Size	Refresh rate at native resolution	HDR	Panel technology
Acer	XB272-HDR	3840x2160	27"	144 Hz	Yes	IPS
Acer	Predator BFGD	3840×2160	65"	120 Hz overclocked	Yes	?
AOC	AG273UG	3840x2160	27"	144 Hz	Yes	IPS
AOC	AG273QCG	2560x1440	27"	165 Hz	No	TN
AOC	AG353UCG	3440×1440	35"	200 Hz overclocked	Yes	VA
Asus	PG35VQ	3440x1440	35"	200 Hz	Yes	AMVA?
Asus	PG65	3840×2160	65"	120 Hz overclocked	Yes	?

== List of G-Sync enabled desktop GPUs ==
Architecture
Kepler	Kepler (refresh)	Maxwell	Pascal	Volta	Turing	Ampere	Ada Lovelace	Blackwell
GeForce GTX 650 Ti Boost	GeForce GTX 760	GeForce GTX 745	GeForce GT 1030	Titan V	GeForce GTX 1650	GeForce RTX 3050	GeForce RTX 4060	GeForce RTX 5060
GeForce GTX 660	GeForce GTX 770	GeForce GTX 750	GeForce GTX 1050		GeForce GTX 1650 Super	GeForce RTX 3060	GeForce RTX 4060 Ti	GeForce RTX 5060 Ti
GeForce GTX 660 Ti	GeForce GTX 780	GeForce GTX 750 Ti	GeForce GTX 1050 Ti		GeForce GTX 1660	GeForce RTX 3060 Ti	GeForce RTX 4070	GeForce RTX 5070
GeForce GTX 670	GeForce GTX 780 Ti	GeForce GTX 950	GeForce GTX 1060		GeForce GTX 1660 Super	GeForce RTX 3070	GeForce RTX 4070 Super	GeForce RTX 5070 ti
GeForce GTX 680	GeForce GTX Titan	GeForce GTX 960	GeForce GTX 1070		GeForce GTX 1660 Ti	GeForce RTX 3070 Ti	GeForce RTX 4070 Ti	GeForce RTX 5080
GeForce GTX 690	GeForce GTX Titan Black	GeForce GTX 965M	GeForce GTX 1070 Ti		GeForce RTX 2060	GeForce RTX 3080	GeForce RTX 4070 Ti Super	GeForce RTX 5090
	GeForce GTX Titan Z	GeForce GTX 970	GeForce GTX 1080		GeForce RTX 2060 Super	GeForce RTX 3080 Ti	GeForce RTX 4080	
		GeForce GTX 970M	GeForce GTX 1080 Ti		GeForce RTX 2070	GeForce RTX 3090	GeForce RTX 4080 Super	
		GeForce GTX 980	Titan X		GeForce RTX 2070 Super	GeForce RTX 3090 Ti	GeForce RTX 4090	
		GeForce GTX 980M	Titan Xp		GeForce RTX 2080			
		GeForce GTX 980 Ti			GeForce RTX 2080 Super			
		GeForce GTX Titan X			GeForce RTX 2080 Ti			
					RTX Titan			

== G-Sync notebook ==
Nvidia announced that G-Sync will be available to notebook manufacturers and that in this case, it would not require a special module since the GPU is directly connected to the display without a scaler in between. According to Nvidia, fine tuning is still possible given the fact that all notebooks of the same model will have the same LCD panel, variable overdrive will be calculated by shaders running on the GPU, and a form of frame collision avoidance will also be implemented.

== "Big Format" gaming displays ==
At CES 2018 Nvidia announced a line of large gaming monitors built by HP, Asus and Acer with 65-inch panels, 4K, HDR, as well as G-Sync support. The inclusion of G-Sync modules make the monitors among the first TV-sized displays to feature variable refresh-rates.

== G-Sync Compatible displays ==
At CES 2019, Nvidia announced that they will support variable refresh rate monitors with FreeSync technology under a new standard named G-Sync Compatible. All monitors under this new standard have been tested by Nvidia to meet their baseline requirements for variable refresh rate and will enable G-Sync automatically when used with an Nvidia GPU. However, users with any FreeSync monitor, including those that are not officially certified may choose to enable the G-Sync option in the Nvidia Control Panel. Unlike G-Sync, G-Sync Compatible displays are only compatible with the GTX 10-series and onwards.
