= OpenXC =

OpenXC is a hardware and software API for automobiles developed by Ford Bug Labs and proposed as an open standard.

At this time, the API is read-only (unlike the OBDII interface) and provides a small number of vehicle measurement parameters only (Engine speed, Vehicle speed, GPS position etc.).

== History ==
- March 2012: Beta program announced
- 9 January 2012: OpenXC Platform Released

== Architecture ==
A typical implementation uses the following architectural layers:

- Vehicle electronic control units
- CAN Bus
- OBDII Interface
- OpenXC Vehicle interface Module
- OpenXC wire messages over USB or Bluetooth
- OpenXC driver or service on a device (currently Android) E.g. OpenXC Enabler app for Android.
- OpenXC enabled applications. See Android sample applications: retro-gauge and mpg.

Not all these layers are necessary, e.g. a vehicle might implement a native CAN Bus interface to USB or Bluetooth, without using the OBD socket or the reference OpenXC Vehicle interface Module. Or an alternative to the reference OpenXC Vehicle interface Module could be developed with a common ELM327 interface.

== API ==
The data available via the API as at January 2012 includes

- AcceleratorPedalPosition
- BrakePedalStatus
- EngineSpeed
- FineOdometer - a persistent odometer recording)
- FuelConsumed - fuel consumed since the vehicle was started)
- FuelLevel - current level of fuel in the gas tank.
- HeadlampStatus - are headlamps are off or on.
- HighBeamStatus
- IgnitionStatus
- Latitude
- Longitude
- Odometer
- ParkingBrakeStatus - is the parking brake is engaged or not.
- SteeringWheelAngle
- TorqueAtTransmission - the actual current torque in the transmission.
- TransmissionGearPosition - the actual current gear of the transmission.
- TurnSignalStatus
- VehicleButtonEvent A ButtonEvent represents a button press, release or hold on the vehicle HMI.
- VehicleDoorStatus - is a door ajar?
- VehicleSpeed - the current forward speed of the vehicle.
- WindshieldWiperStatus

== OpenXC Vs OBD ==
Any information available from the current OpenXC API (and much more) is available from the OBD interface. However the core OBD standard is concerned with the engine train, emissions and faults (much more data is available through custom PIDs) while OpenXC is focused on high-level instrumentation of more interest to a driver.

The potential advantages of using OpenXC include

- Most useful information available from OBD interfaces uses proprietary PIDs that may differ by manufacturer and Vehicle. OpenXC could offer a standard interface, similar to the ELM327 interface.
- An OBD interface may be complex to implement, while the OpenXC API is designed to be friendly for application developers

Possible advantages of using the OBD interface include

- Use well established existing OBD interface hardware and software, e.g. using the ELM327 protocol
- The additional hardware layer for OpenXC is currently much more expensive than OBD interfaces
- Access additional functions than the limited set available via OpenXC. E.g. manifold vacuum (OBD PID 01-0B).
- Few vehicles currently support OpenXC (8 Ford models as at January 2013), while nearly all modern vehicles support OBD
- Ability to write data back to vehicle, e.g. to clear fault codes.

== See also ==
- On-Board Diagnostics
- OBD-II PIDs
- Arduino
- OBDuino
- ELM327
- Trip computer
- Carputer
