= Dolch =

American computer manufacturer (1987–2005)

Dolch Computer Systems Inc.
- Founded: 1987
- Founder: Volker Dolch
- Defunct: 2005
- Fate: Acquired by Kontron AG
- Website: dolch.com at the Wayback Machine (archived 1999-11-28)

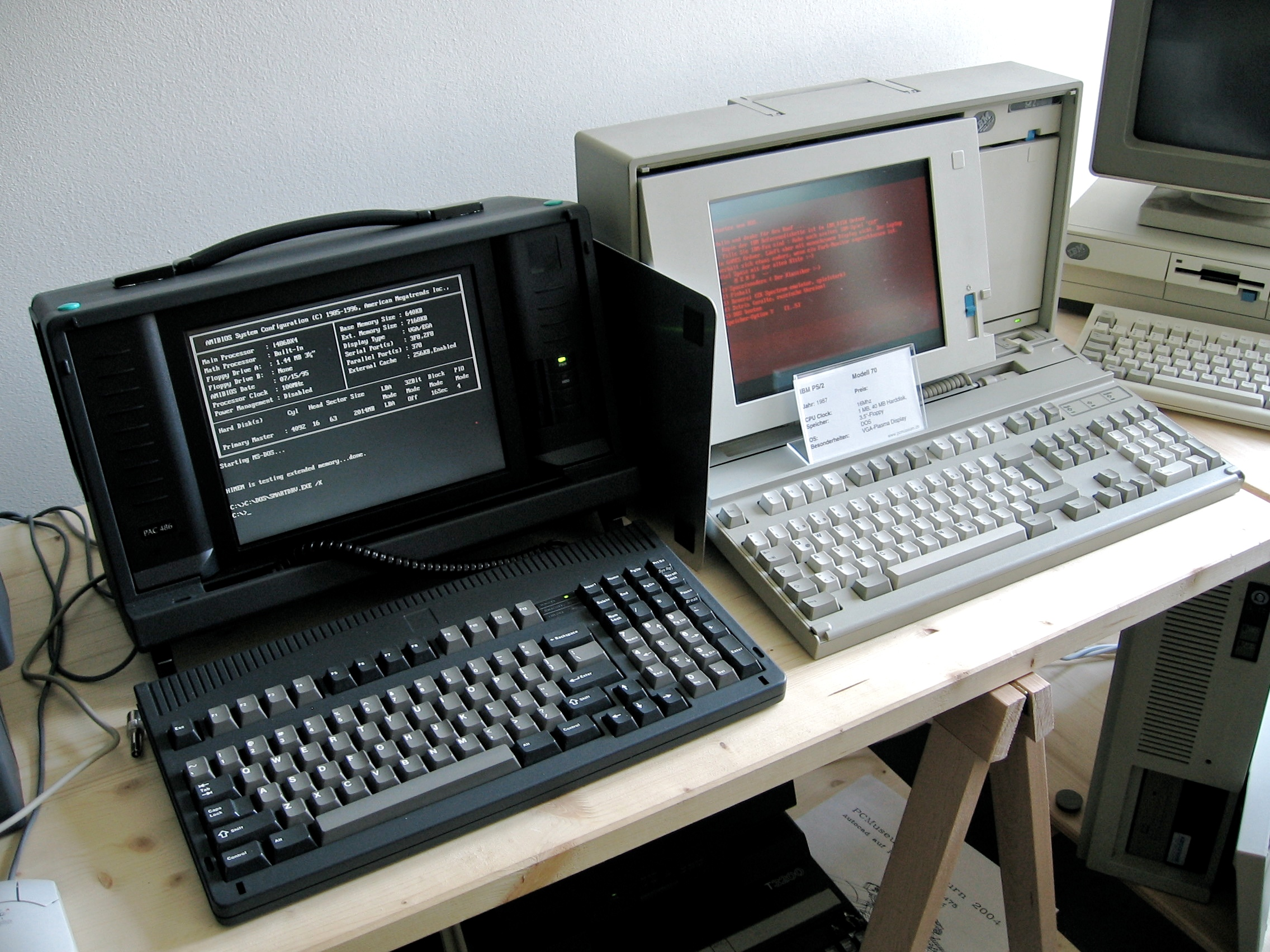
Dolch Computer Systems PAC 486 next to an IBM P70

Dolch Computer Systems Inc. (stylized as Dolch.) was a manufacturer of high-end ruggedized portable computers for industrial usage.

== History ==
The company was founded by Volker Dolch in 1987 in California. He sold his interest in the company in 1996 but continued to run it until he retired in 2001.

In February 2005, Dolch was acquired by Kontron AG from Siegel-Robert, Inc. Kontron sold its rugged mobile platform to Azonix in 2007.

== Products ==
=== Portable Add-in Computers (PAC) ===
A suitcase sized, luggable business computer designed for users seeking top-notch performance, expandability and portability.

- Dolch PAC 586
- Dolch PAC 486
- Dolch PAC 386

==== Dolch PAC 60 Series ====
Part of the main line of PACs, but designed and sold to be used as "Network Sniffers". These systems typically sold with industrial boards featuring commercial expansion such as EISA, and other extended expansion such as Vesa Local Bus. They would also include software and hardware for diagnosing various networking systems, primarily Token Ring, Ethernet, and Fiber Optic.

- PAC 60 ( Intel 486DX-66, standard size featuring 4 expansion slots. 4 EISA + 3 VLB )
- PAC 61 ( Intel 486DX-66, size reduced model featuring 2 expansion slots. )
- PAC 62 ( Intel Pentium )
- PAC 63 ( Intel Pentium )
- PAC 64 ( Intel Pentium, and later Pentium MMX )
- PAC 65 ( Intel Pentium II )

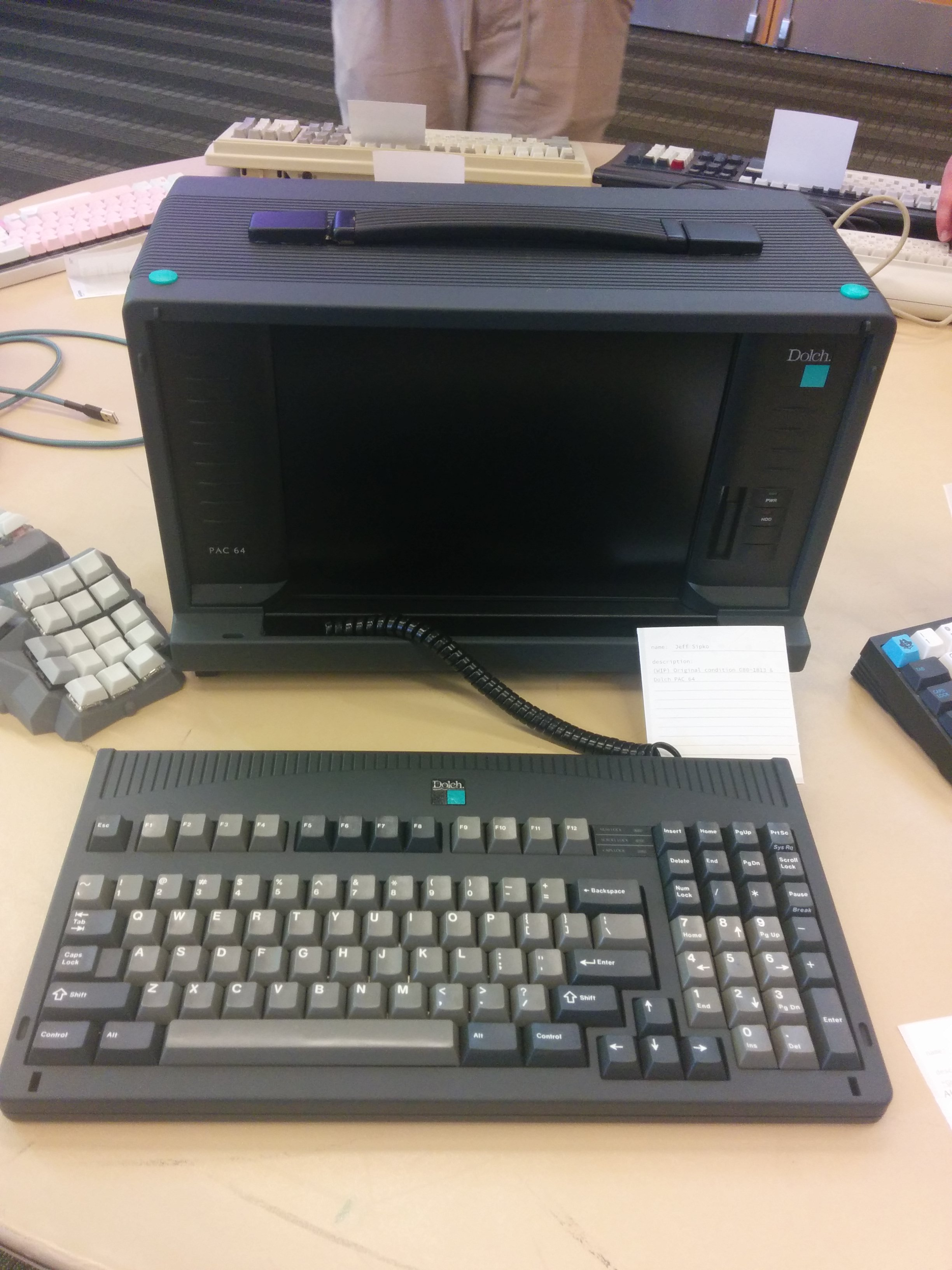
Example of a Dolch PAC 64.

==== V-PAC ====
Stylized " V-P.A.C.™ ", is the generation of luggable systems prior to the 60 series. Its based on a similar chassis, with differing fascia.

- V-PAC 486 ( Follows with the processor speed, such as "V-PAC 486-33" )
- V-PAC 386 ( Same method as above, "V-PAC 386SX-33". )

==== MegaPAC ====
Large, Oscilloscope looking models designed to run instrumentation hardware and software. Like other Dolch products it has a high regard for vibration and shock safety.

==== FlexPAC ====
Designed as a space efficient yet expandable system while maintaining industrial level chassis strength.

==== FieldPAC ====
An aluminum chassis rugged laptop.

- Dolch FieldPAC FPAC5-233-XG

==== NotePAC ====
A Dolch Notepac A760, with underslung PCI bay attachment.

A rugged all-metal laptop, akin to the Panasonic Toughbook. Processors range from Intel 486s to Pentium Ms.

Some Notepac model numbers are possibly re-used between system refreshes.

- Notepac A320S
- Notepac A760 ( Pentium II )
- Notepac A770 ( Pentium M )

==== DuraPAC ====
A laptop-luggable hybrid with a fully sealed chassis. Advertised as surviving "Industrial Lethal Zones"

==== Pack Portable ====
A direct predecessor to the PAC line of computers, sharing its design philosophy.

- Dolch 286-Pack Portable Computer

=== Computer Hardware ===
==== The Viper ====
PCI and ISA video cards designed for use in OEM products, intended to drive external displays and internal LCDs. PitViper cards where shipped with Dolch PAC 60 Series systems.

- PitViper 535 (Chips & Tech. F65535 Chipset. 1 MB EDO Memory.)
- PitViper 545 (Chips & Tech. F65545 Chipset. 1 MB EDO memory.)

=== Integrated Panel Displays ===
==== DataView / SmartView ====
Compact, High Resolution displays with integrated computer hardware designed to replace CRT's confined use conditions. Optionally had integrated computer hardware.

==== "The Panel Mount" ====
Variant of the DataView and SmartView designed to be custom mounted.

===== OmniView / ECI =====
Larger panels and integrated PC's designed for use in OEM hardware.

=== Other Displays ===
==== PixelView. ====
Possibly also known as the PixelVision ( As denoted on the interior of the monitor ), is a rugged LCD with an integrated cabinet. It takes VGA video input. It also features OSD controls for brightness and video correction, and VESA mounts. Optionally shipped with touchscreen abilities.
