= HUDWAY =

American technology company

HUDWAY LLC
- Type: Private
- Industry: Technology
- Founded: 2013
- Founder: Alex Ostanin; Ivan Klabukov
- Headquarters: Huntington Beach, CA, United States
- Products: Automobile Gadgets; Mobile Applications
- Website: hudway.co

HUDWAY is a California-based technology company that produces automotive head-up display (HUD) devices and software. The company was founded in 2013 by cousins Ivan Klabukov and Alex Ostanin.

== Products ==
=== HUDWAY Drive ===
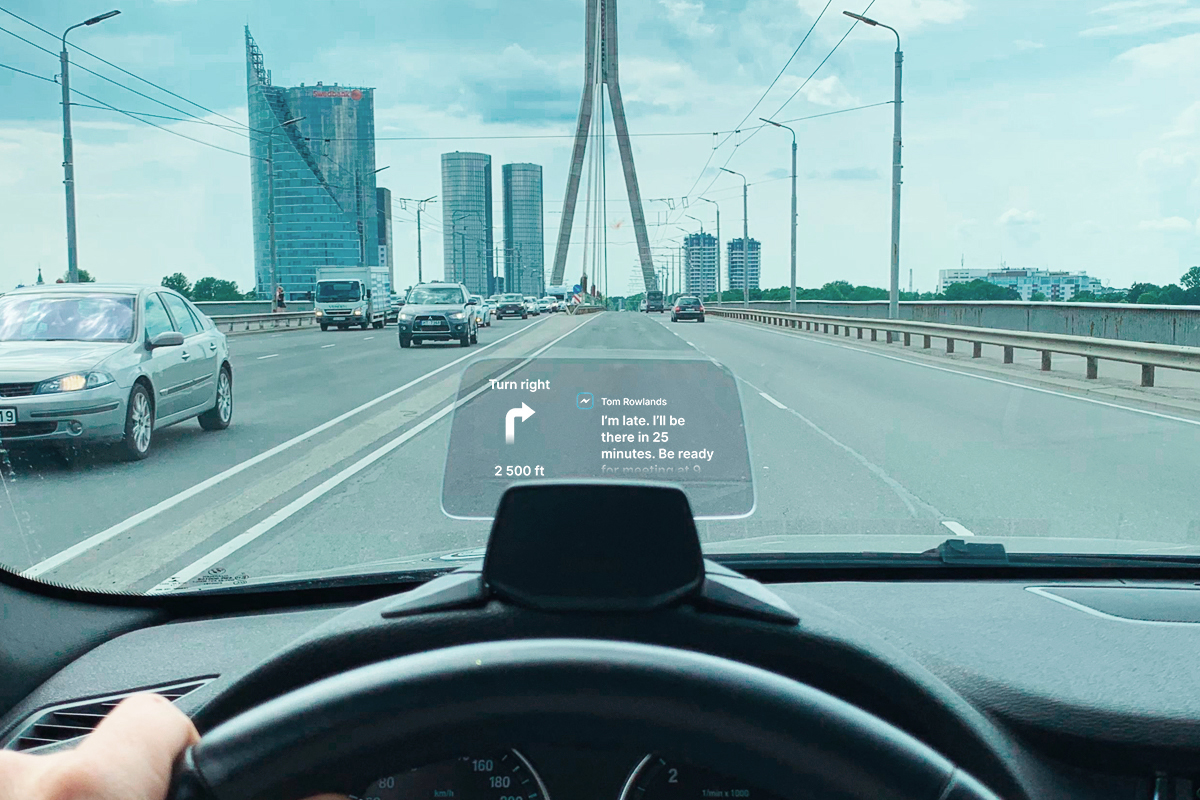
HUDWAY Drive

HUDWAY Drive is a head-up display driving device that mounts onto a vehicle dash to bring needed information into driver's line of sight. It is designed to prevent the user from holding the phone while driving.

The device uses BLE to connect to a smartphone and an OBD-II scanner, then it can display the following information:

- Car data (speed, RPM, battery voltage, fuel consumption, fuel level, coolant temperature, oil temperature)
- Navigation
- Notifications
- Track name and artist

Setup can be done using the iOS or Android app.

=== HUDWAY Drive for Tesla Model 3 & Y ===
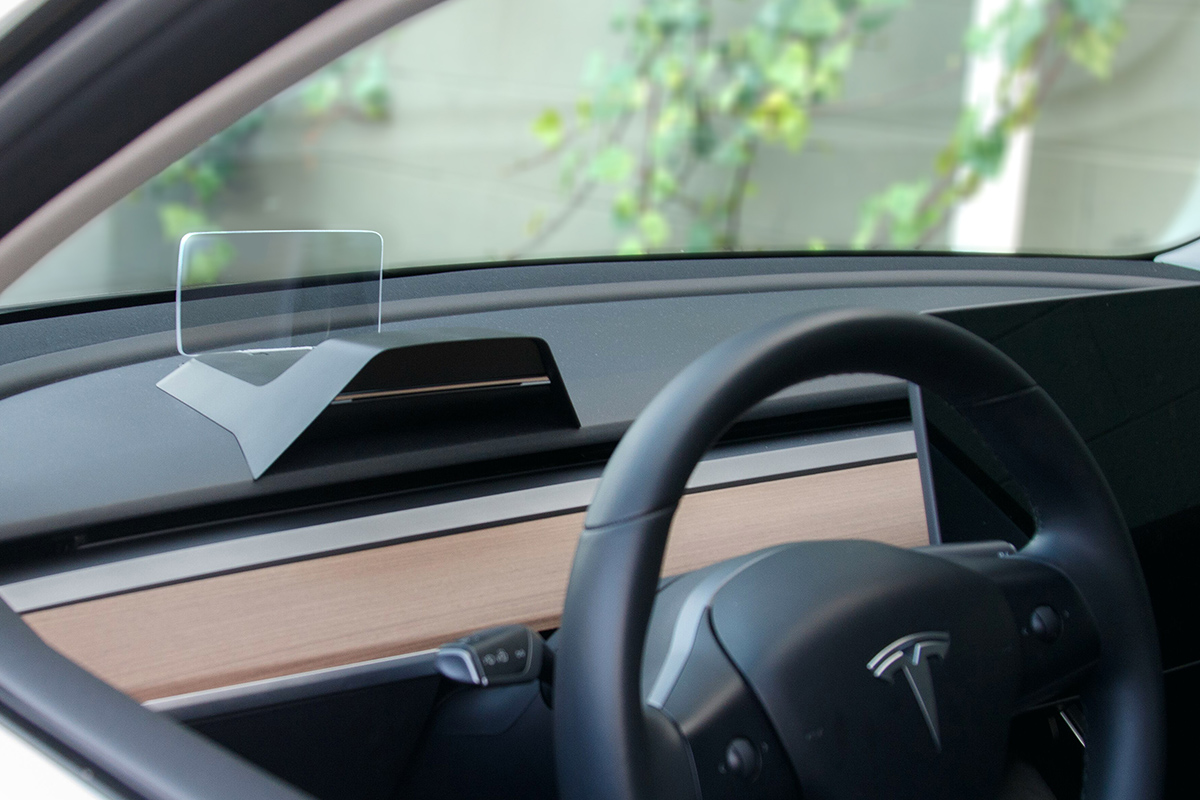
HUDWAY Drive Tesla Model 3/Y Edition

In 2019, HUDWAY introduced the head-up display adapted to be used in Tesla Model 3 and Tesla Model Y vehicles.

Compared to the regular version of the HUDWAY Drive, the version for Tesla vehicles has a different body design to fit on the Tesla Model 3 & Y dashboard, as well as a different way to transmit vehicle data to the HUD device.

Whereas the regular HUDWAY Drive uses an OBD-II interface which it accesses using a ELM327-based Bluetooth OBD-II scanner, the HUDWAY Drive Tesla Model 3/Y Edition transmitter connects to the vehicle through the 2xCAN interface.

The data that can be received by the transmitter:

- Speed
- Speed limits captured by Tesla built-in camera
- Power
- G-sensor data
- Battery level
- Battery capacity
- Battery temperature
- Remaining range
- Average energy consumption
- Turn indicators
- Blind spot alerts
- Selected gear
- Current trip information (time, distance, average speed, etc.)

=== HUDWAY Glass ===
In March 2015, the company unveiled HUDWAY Glass to address the problem of distracted driving. HUDWAY Glass is a universal vehicle accessory that turns a smartphone into a head-up display; it works with apps that support HUD mode, including HUDWAY's own.

Affixed to the dashboard in drivers' line of sight, HUDWAY Glass is equipped with a semi-transparent glass that reflects navigation information off of drivers' cell phones display or screen and allows to see the road clearly nevertheless. All that is needed is to launch any HUD-based app (navigation, speedometer, trip information) and place the phone on the cradle of the device.

In fall 2015, HUDWAY ran a successful Kickstarter campaign raising over $600,000 to launch manufacturing of HUDWAY Glass. Over 9,000 people all over the world backed the project resulting in over 11,000 units of HUDWAY Glass to be delivered. In July 2016, the company began shipments to the backers. Starting in August 2016, HUDWAY Glass is available for sale.

=== HUDWAY app ===
HUDWAY app is an augmented-reality app that projects driving directions onto the windshield for driving in low-visibility conditions, especially at night, in fog, snow or heavy rain. HUDWAY app provides turn by turn directions (incl. driving speed, geographic location, upcoming curves and hills in the road and direction-giving voice assistant) and works off Google, Apple or OpenStreetMap maps.

In 2016, HUDWAY app was replaced by HUDWAY Go app.

=== Other apps ===
HUDWAY has a portfolio of HUD-based navigation related apps, including Speedometer by HUDWAY, HUDWAY Go and HUD Widgets app.

== Awards and recognitions ==
In January 2016, TWICE Magazine named HUDWAY Glass one of the most interesting products presented at CES 2016.

In February 2016, Fast Company named HUDWAY as one of the top 10 most innovative companies in the automotive sector for 2016, alongside Tesla and Ford.

In February 2016, HUDWAY received Global Startup of the Year award in Moscow, Russia.

In May 2022, Tom's Guide awarded HUDWAY Drive first place among aftermarket head-up displays.

== See also ==
- Optical head-mounted display
- Augmented reality
- HUD (video gaming)
- Virtual retinal display
