= Panel PC =

Industrial touch screen panel PC

A panel PC, also known as a panel-mounted computer, touch panel PC, or industrial panel PC, is a combined industrial PC and monitor so that the entire computer can be mounted in any manner available for mounting a display alone. It eliminates the need for a separate space for the computer.

Panel PCs are commonly used in automation, manufacturing, process control, and machinery control applications. A panel PC is typically ruggedized with higher dependability applications for use in industrial or high-traffic settings.

== Mounting ==
Panel PCs can have a variety of mounting options including panel mounting, VESA Mount (Flat Display Mounting Interface), rackmount or DIN rail Mount.

Panel PCs often come with mounting brackets or flanges for direct installation onto a panel, or a cutout in an enclosure such as an electrical enclosure. The enclosure can be electrical cabinets, control panels, and machinery cabinets.

Cooling is a consideration when mounting a panel PC into electrical enclosure or rackmount.

== Construction and features ==
Panel PCs may include a range of ports and connectivity options such as serial port, EtherNet/IP, CAN bus, Modbus.

A panel PC typically has a touchscreen (Touch Panel PC) which enables users to interact with the computer directly on the display. This eliminates the need for separate input devices such as a keyboard or a computer mouse.

Panel PCs come in various display sizes, ranging as small as 6 inches up to 24 inches.

Heavy-duty panel PC models have front panels sealed to be waterproof according to IP67 standards, and includes models which are explosion proof for installation in hazardous environments.

== See also ==
- Industrial PC
- Industry 4.0
- Embedded system
- Rugged computer
- Carputer
- All-in-one computer (AIO)
