= Trip computer =

Computer fitted to some cars

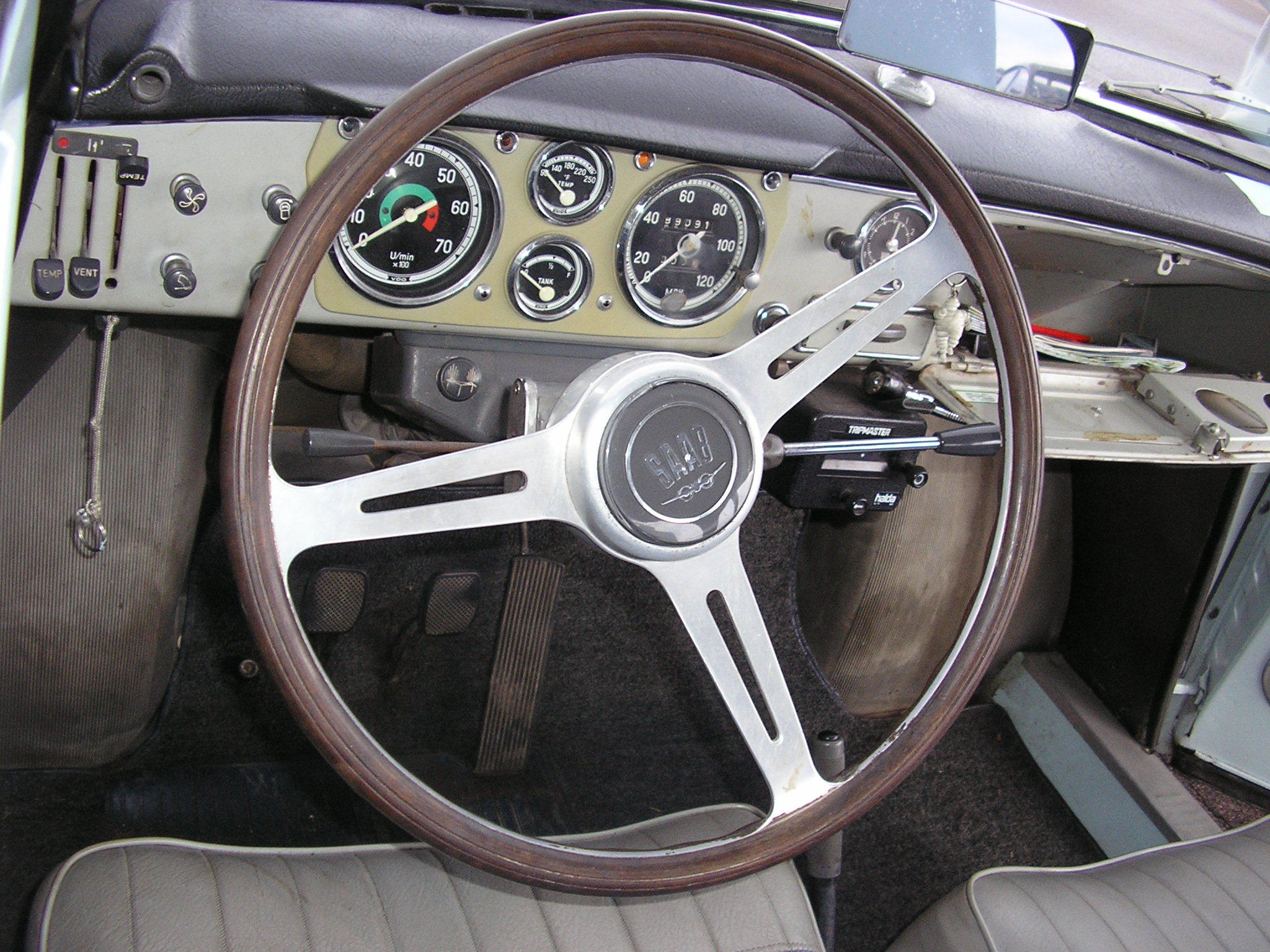
A Halda Tripmaster is mounted under the dash of this Saab GT850.

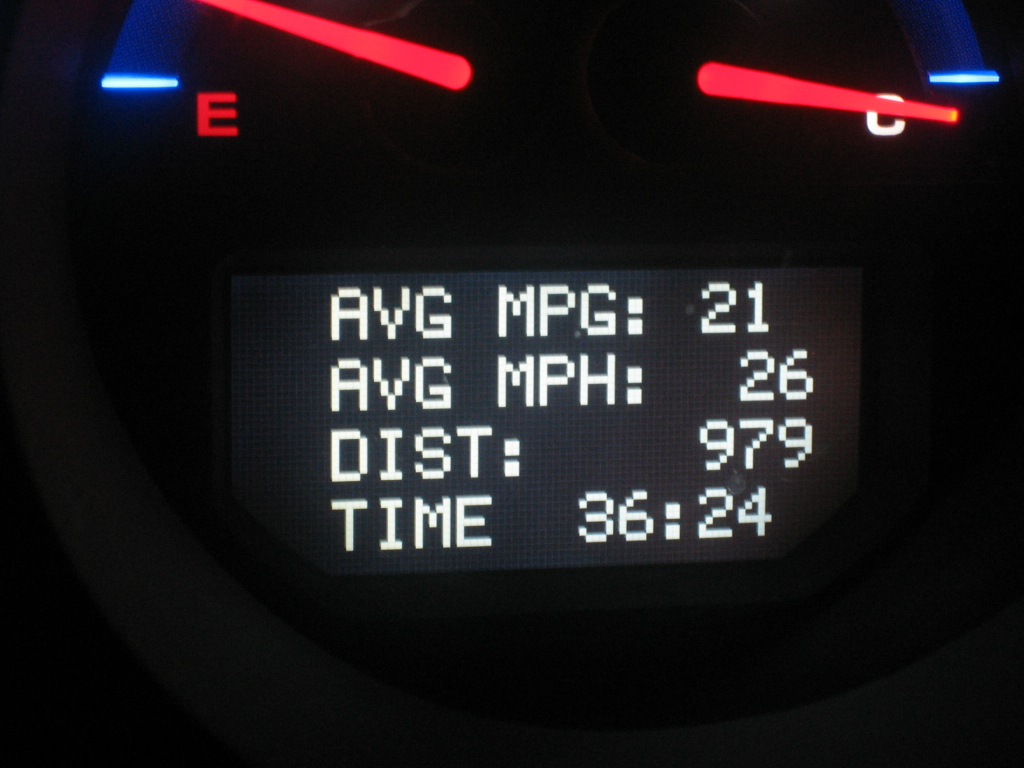
The trip computer's display in a 2004 Acura TL, tracking the average mileage, average speed, and distance traveled for the stated time period.

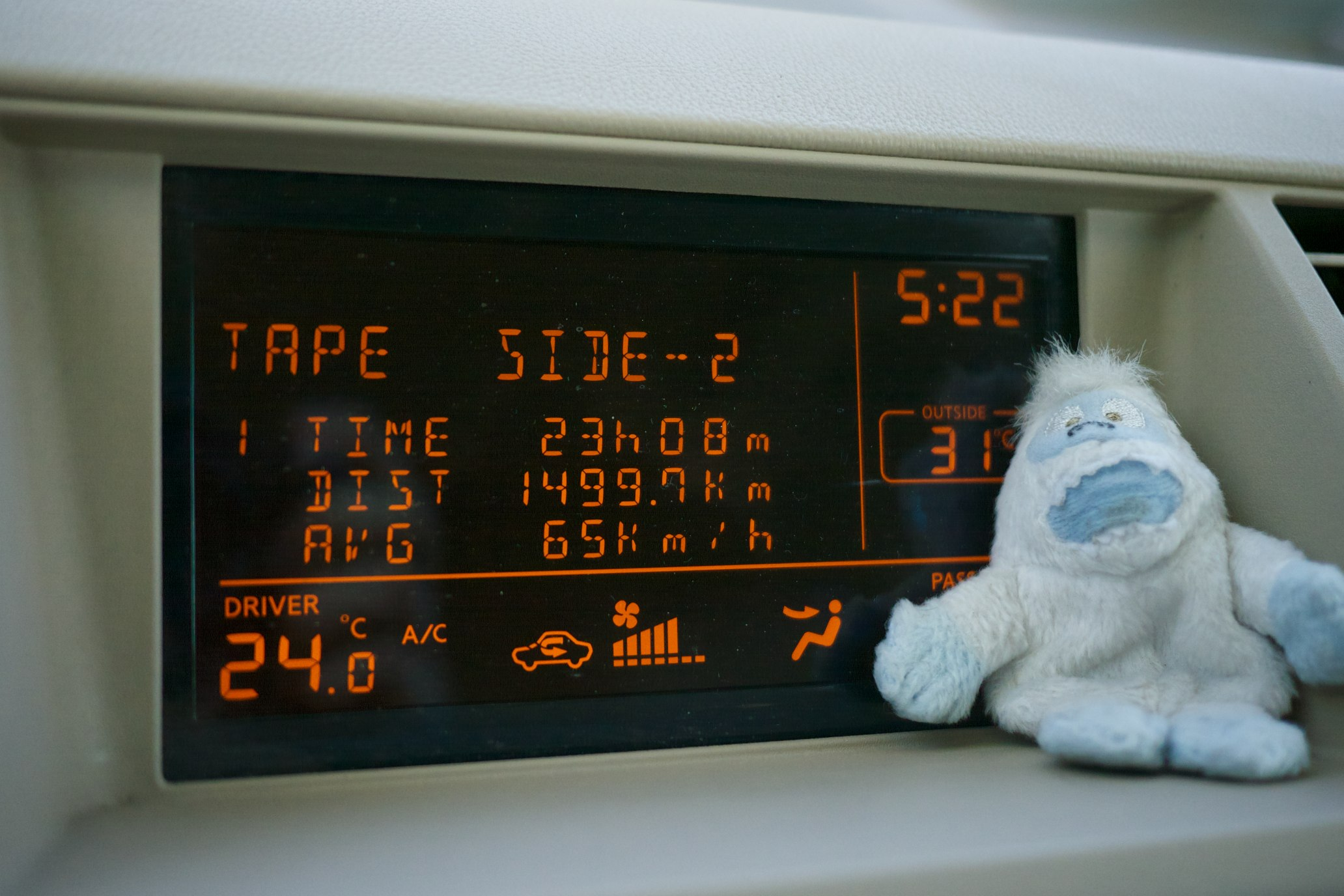
Trip computer display

A trip computer is a computer fitted to some cars; most modern trip computers record, calculate, and display the distance travelled, the average speed, the average fuel consumption, and real-time fuel consumption.

The first, mechanical trip computers, such as the Halda Speedpilot, produced by a Swedish taximeter manufacturer, were made in the 1950s as car accessories to enable the driver to maintain a given time schedule, particularly useful in rallying. One was installed as standard equipment in the 1958 Saab GT750. The 1952 Fiat 1900 came standard with a complex mechanical device, called mediometro in Italian, that showed the average speed. In 1978, the Cadillac division of General Motors introduced the "Cadillac Trip Computer", available on the Cadillac Seville; Chrysler also launched an electric trip computer on its low-end Omni/Horizon. They can range from basic to complex. The most basic trip computers incorporate average fuel mileage and perhaps an outside temperature display. Mid-range versions often include information on fuel, speed, distance, cardinal heading (compass), and elapsed time. The most advanced trip computers are reserved for high-end cars and often display average calculations for two drivers, a stop watch, tire-pressure information, over-speed warnings, and many other features.

Sometimes the trip computer's display is in the gauge cluster, the dashboard or navigation-system screen, or an overhead console. Some displays include information about scheduled maintenance. The current Acura TL does this in stages, first alerting the driver with a "Due Soon" message; once the programmed mileage is reached, the message is "Due Now"; when more time or distance has elapsed, the message changes to "Past Due". Mercedes-Benz vehicles constantly monitor the quality of the oil and alert the driver when the oil has degraded to a certain extent. GM and FCA vehicles provide oil change alerts based on the number and length of trips, engine temperature, and other factors. Some vehicles also use the trip computer to allow owners to change certain aspects of vehicle behavior, e.g. how the power locks work, but in most cars "setting preferences" is now done through a center screen also used for the backup camera and radio.

Some trip computers can display the diagnostic codes that mechanics use. This is especially useful when the mechanic wants to see the codes while driving the car. In 2004, Linear Logic developed the ScanGauge, which at the time was the only easily installed (via OBDII) accessory that worked as a trip computer, 4 simultaneous digital gauges, and a diagnostic trouble-code reader. This device has available 12 different measurements which can be used as the 4 digital gauges. The units of measure can be independently selected between miles/km, gallons/liters, Celsius/Fahrenheit, and PSI/kPa.

In 2008, the OBDuino project announced a low-cost DIY trip computer design using the OBDII interface and the Arduino hobbyist microcontroller platform, released under the GPL open source license.

== See also ==
- OBDuino, an open source trip computer
- Some Carputer software includes trip computer functions
- Tachograph
