= OBDuino =

Open source trip computer design

OBDuino is an open source trip computer design based on the Arduino platform. An OBDuino may be assembled and customised by an electronics hobbyist; it displays information such as instantaneous fuel economy (e.g. miles per gallon, L/100 km or kilometres per litre), engine tuning parameters etc. on an LCD.

OBDuino utilises the On-Board Diagnostics interface found in most modern cars.

== Features ==
- Most OBD-II PIDs or derived values may be displayed. Common values include
  - Fuel: cost, used or remaining, wasted while idling, consumption, measured in mpg or l/100 km
  - Engine: load, RPM
  - Temperatures: coolant, air intake
  - Vehicle speed
  - Tank distance
  - Remaining distance that can be travelled on the current tank of fuel
  - Throttle position
  - Battery voltage
  - CAN status, for CAN protocol only, display TX and RX error
- Displays instantaneous values, average, maximum and minimum values calculated per trip, per outing, or per tank of fuel
- Menu system for configuring parameters
- Relatively cheap compared to commercial alternatives
- Customisable and extendable

OBDuino does not display or reset engine fault codes (which are available over the OBD interface).

== Design ==
The key components of the design are:

- A microcontroller. One of the various AVR-based Arduino kits is typically used for this, although one of several Atmel AVR microcontrollers may be used directly in a custom OBDuino circuit.
- An interface to the car's management system, using the On-Board Diagnostics (OBD) connector found in most modern cars. This requires a cable and a circuit. There are several variations of this circuit depending on the particular OBD protocol implemented:
  1. ISO 9141/ISO 9141-2/ISO 14230, using Freescale MCZ33290EF
  2. CAN, using MCP2515 and MCP2551
  3. Generic (SAE J1850 PWM & VPW/ISO 9141/ISO 9141-2/ISO 14230/CAN protocols), using an ELM327 from ELM Electronics. Although this gives a more versatile trip computer compatible with most modern vehicles, the ELM327 chip adds significant cost to the circuit and requires a significant supporting circuit for different protocols. It removes the complexity of interpreting the various OBD protocols.
  4. STN1110 which is software compatible with the ELM327. Unfortunately, this IC is not pin-compatible with the ELM327, therefore the circuit would require some changes.
- An LCD and three input buttons. A typical LCD is 2 rows x 16 characters or 4x20 character, based on the HD44780, with a circuit based on the mpguino circuit.
- Microcontroller code. This is a C++ program based on the Arduino framework, called a Sketch in Arduino terminology. This is loaded on the microcontroller over a USB or serial interface using the free Arduino integrated development environment.

Many Arduino-based projects have either custom printed circuit boards available which include the AVR microcontroller (removing the need for an Arduino board), or extension boards that contain the extra circuit and that plug directly into the standard Arduino circuit board. No such PCBs are available for the OBDuino as of September 2009.

== Project ==
The OBDuino project was started in 2008 based on the MPGuino project, with the desire to simplify wiring to the vehicle, instead of using the standard OBD-II socket that does not directly wire to the vehicle's fuel injection system and digital vehicle speed sensor, and to access the wide range of engine management data available using OBD.

The project is centred on the discussion forum on ecomodder.com and the wiki and code hosting provided by Google code, project is released under the GPL license.

The main OBDuino thread on the eccomoder forum was started by jmonroe on 1 June 2008 as a fork of MPGuino discussions.

Magister posted an OBDuino announcement to the Arduino forum on 4 December 2008.

As of September 2009, the OBDuino32K code credits these developers:

Main coding/ISO/ELM: Frédéric (aka Magister on ecomodder.com)
LCD part: Dave (aka dcb on ecomodder.com), optimized by Frédéric
ISO Communication Protocol: Russ, Antony, Mike
Features: Mike, Antony
Bugs & Fixes: Antony, Frédéric, Mike

The 32K in the obduino32K name differentiates the code targeted at the Atmega328 with 32k flash memory (i.e. Arduino 2009) version from the Atmega168 16k (Arduino 2008) version.

== Variations ==
- An OBDuino variant is described in the book Practical Arduino (2009) by Jonathan Oxer and Hugh Blemings. Based on the Arduino Mega, the OBDuino is extended to log GPS and OBD data to a USB stick.
- A Graphical OBD MPGuino graphs values such as miles per gallon and OBD-II PIDs, etc., on a 128*64 pixel LCD.
- OBDuino author Magister is working on a commercial prototype with a CAN-only protocol.

== Related alternatives ==
- Scangauge is a commercial trip computer using the OBD interface. In addition to the trip-computer-style features in OBDuino, the Scangauge also includes features for displaying and resetting engine fault codes.
- The mpguino is another Arduino-based trip computer, and is mainly limited to fuel usage measurement. It may be used in any vehicle which has an electric fuel injection system and digital vehicle speed sensor. The mpguino links directly to these sensors so it doesn't require an OBD2 interface. It can report instant and tank MPG, remaining miles till the tank is empty etc. The mpguino is available in kit form from several suppliers.
- The SuperMID is an enthusiast/hobbyist trip computer, designed originally for the Toyota Prius, although it may be used in any vehicle which has an electric fuel injection system and digital vehicle speed sensor. The SuperMID interfaces directly to the engine ECU or sensors, rather than using a standard OBDII connector.
- Bruce D. Lightner's entry won a 2004 Circuit Cellar design contest. Lightner's design uses an AVR microcontroller connected to an OBD-II interface to drive an analogue gauge displaying fuel consumption in mpg. This only implements the SAE J1850 VPW variant of the OBD-II protocol suite (so it only works with mostly GM cars that use VPW).
- An OBD II Car Computer design is described by NerdKits using their AVR-based microcontroller kit. This implements the SAE J1850 VPW variant of the OBD-II protocol suite (so it only works with certain cars that use VPW) and displays RPMs, Coolant Temperature, Vehicle Speed and Percent Throttle on an LCD. This is partly derived from Bruce D. Lightner's design.
- OBD2-LCD is an AVR based OBD-II trip computer, designed by Florian Schäffer. It implements the ISO 9141 and ISO 14230 (KW 2000) OBD-II variants, with design and code published and available in kit form. The new kit supports CAN (ISO 15765) too.

== See also ==
- Arduino
- Trip computer
- Carputer
- On-Board Diagnostics
- OBD-II PIDs
- ELM327 very common chip used in OBD interfaces
