= Industrial PC =

Type of computer intended for industrial purposes

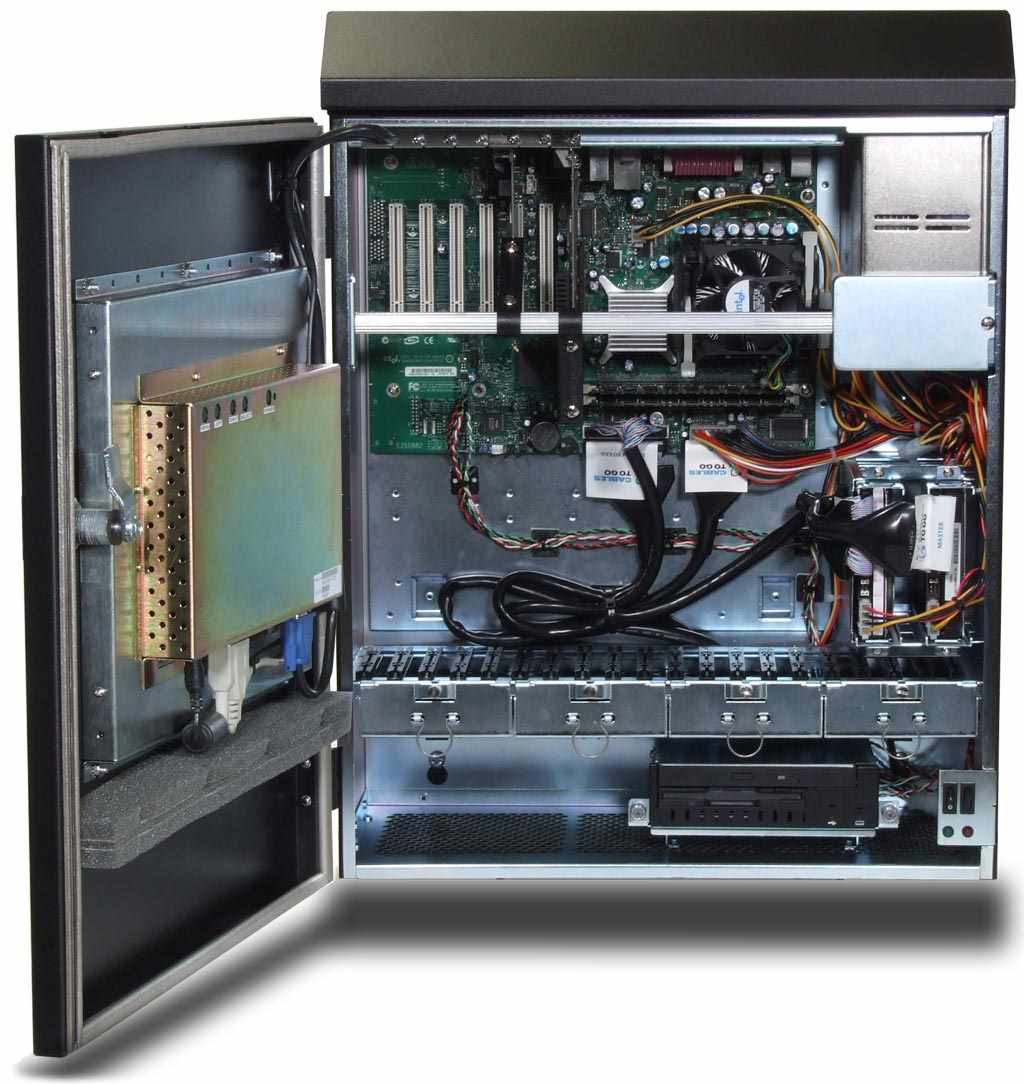
Wall-mounted industrial PC based with ATX motherboard

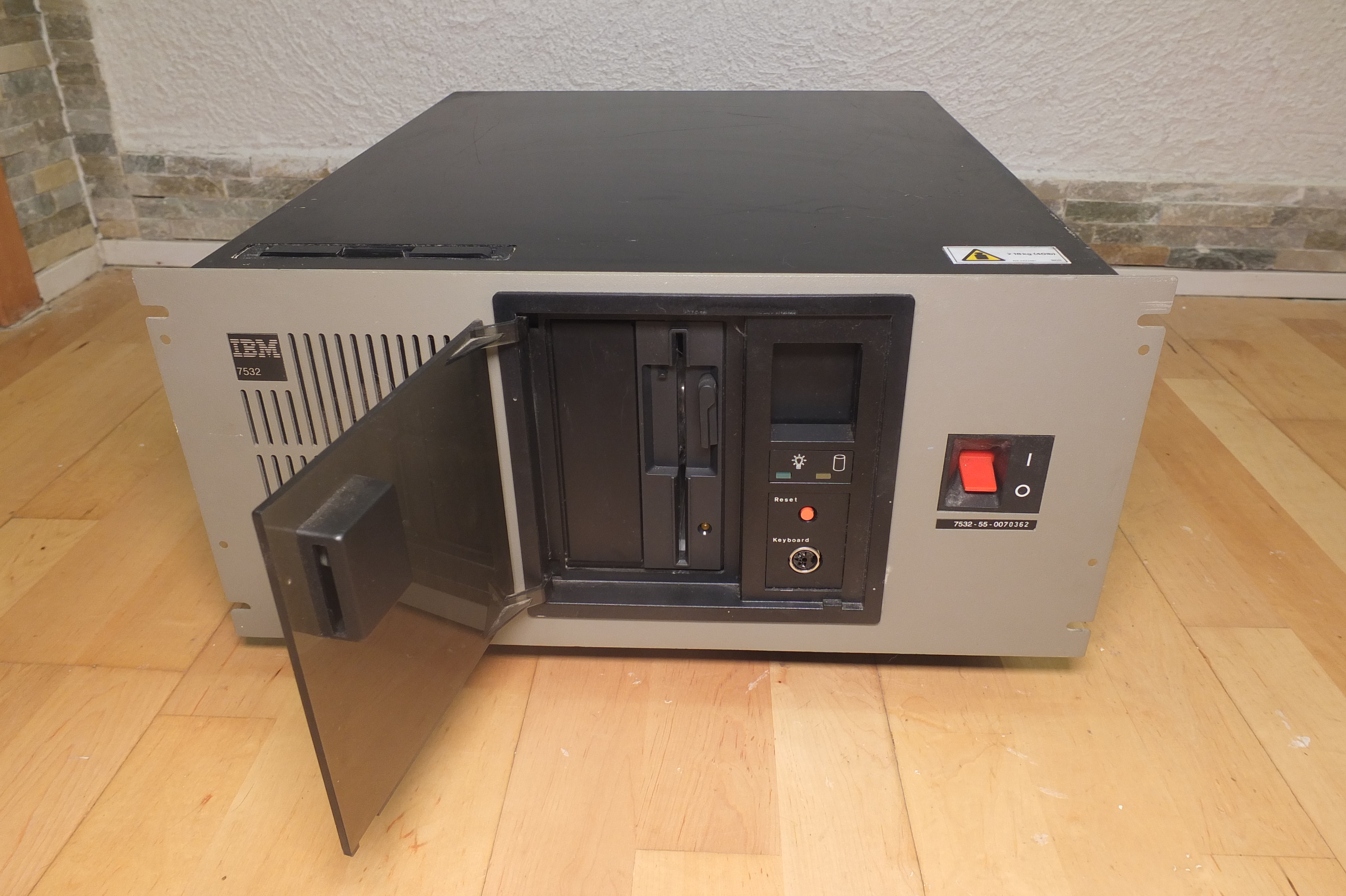
The IBM 7532 Industrial Computer, one of the first industrial PCs ever made, from 1985

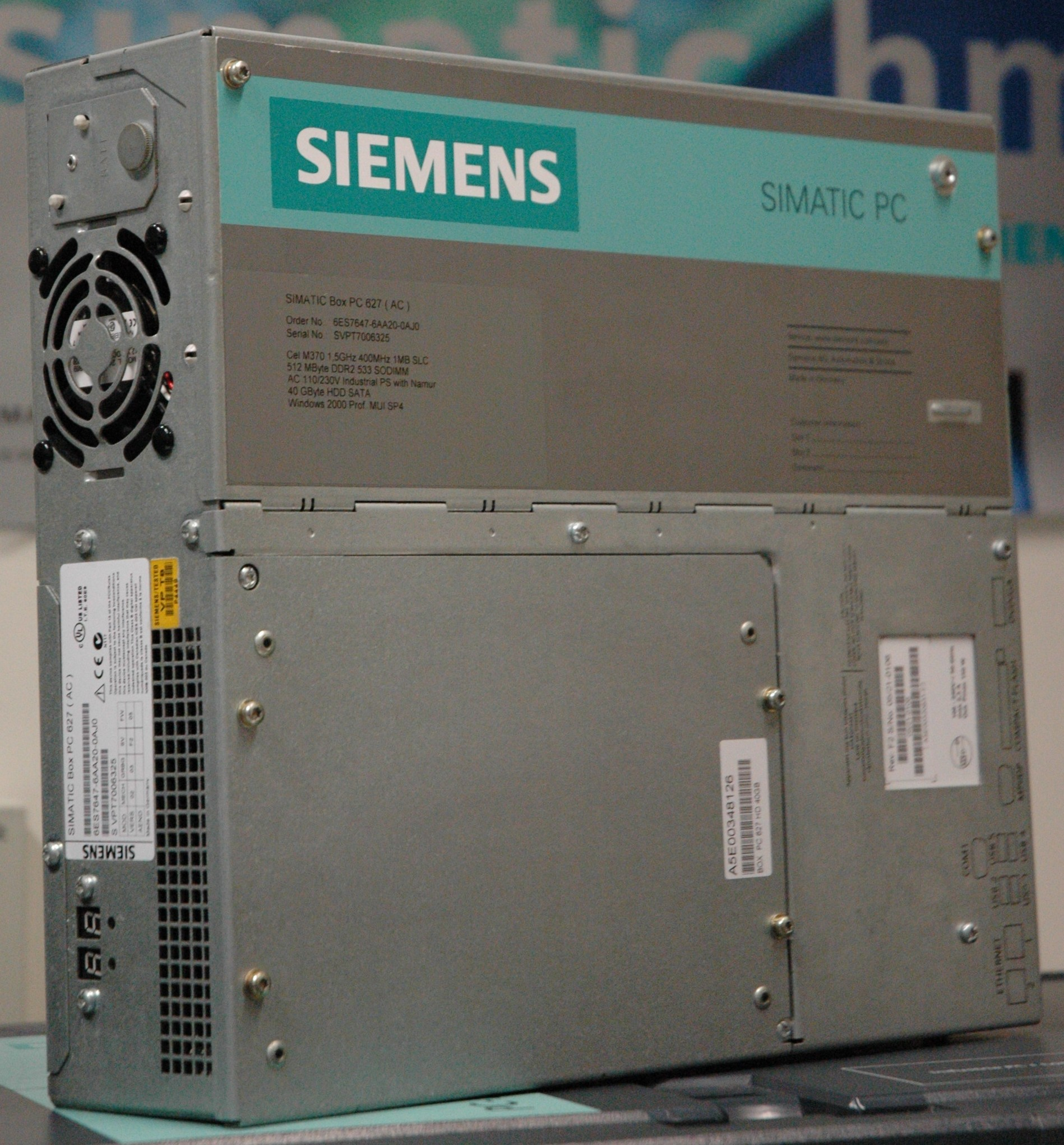
Siemens Simatic Box PC

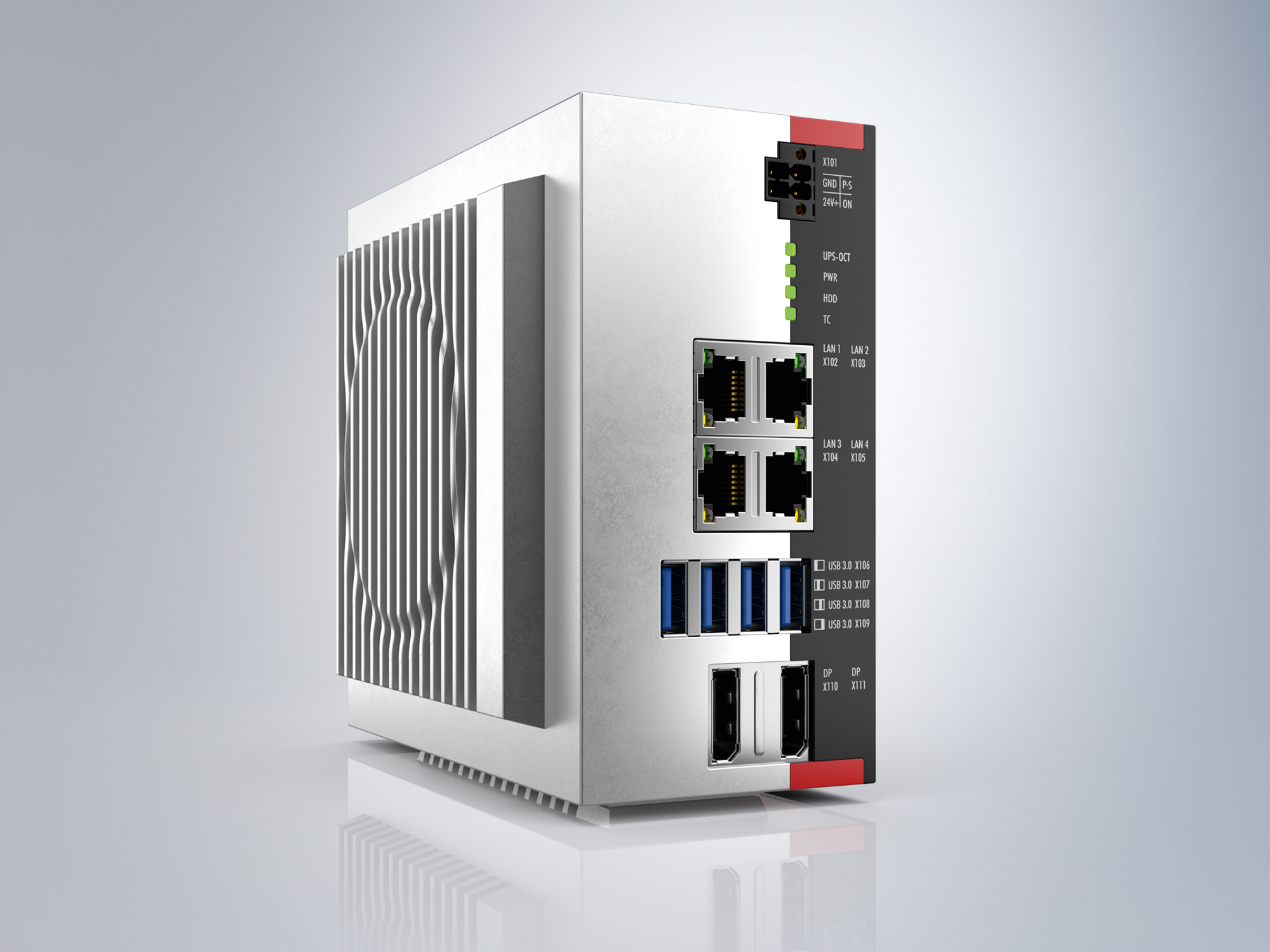
Beckhoff industrial PC

An industrial PC is a computer intended for industrial purposes (production of goods and services), with a form factor between a nettop and a server rack. Industrial PCs have higher dependability and precision standards, and are generally more expensive than consumer electronics. They often use complex instruction sets, such as x86, where reduced instruction sets such as ARM would otherwise be used.

== History ==
IBM released the 5531 Industrial Computer in 1984, arguably the first "industrial PC". The IBM 7531, an industrial version of the IBM AT PC was released May 21, 1985. Industrial Computer Source first offered the 6531 Industrial Computer in 1985. This was a proprietary 4U rackmount industrial computer based on a clone IBM PC motherboard.

== Applications ==
Industrial PCs are primarily used for process control and/or data acquisition. In some cases, an industrial PC is simply used as a front-end to another control computer in a distributed processing environment. Software can be custom written for a particular application or an off-the-shelf package such as TwinCAT, Wonder Ware, Labtech Notebook or LabView can be used to provide a base level of programming. Analog Devices got exclusive sales for OEM European industrial market and provided MACSYM 120 combined IBM 5531 and MACBASIC a multitasking basic running on C/CPM from Digital Research. Analog and digital I/O cards plugged inside PC and/or extension rack made MAC120 as one of the most powerful and easy to use controller for plant applications at this date. An application may simply require the I/O such as the serial port offered by the motherboard. In other cases, expansion cards are installed to provide analog and digital I/O, specific machine interface, expanded communications ports, and so forth, as required by the application.

Industrial PCs offer different features than consumer PCs in terms of reliability, compatibility, expansion options and long-term supply.

Industrial PCs are typically characterized by being manufactured in lower volumes than home or office PCs. A common category of industrial PC is the 19-inch rackmount form factor. Industrial PCs typically cost considerably more than comparable office style computers with similar performance. Single-board computers and back planes are used primarily in industrial PC systems. However, the majority of industrial PCs are manufactured with COTS motherboards.

A subset of industrial PCs is the Panel PC where a display, typically an LCD, is incorporated into the same enclosure as the motherboard and other electronics. These are typically panel mounted and often incorporate touch screens for user interaction. They are offered in low cost versions with no environmental sealing, heavier duty models sealed to IP67 standards to be waterproof at the front panel and including models which are explosion proof for installation into hazardous environments.

== Construction and features ==
Virtually all industrial PCs share an underlying design philosophy of providing a controlled environment for the installed electronics to survive the rigors of the plant floor. The electronic components themselves may be selected for their ability to withstand higher and lower operating temperatures than typical commercial components.

- Heavier metal construction as compared to the typical office non-rugged computer
- Enclosure form factor that includes provision for mounting into the surrounding environment (19" rack, wall mount, panel mount, etc.)
- Additional cooling with air filtering
- Wider operating temperature range than normal PCs, with the widest temperature ranges being -40 to 75°C
- Alternative cooling methods such as forced air, liquid, and conduction
- Expansion card retention and support
- Enhanced EMI filtering and gasket
- Enhanced environmental protection such as dust proof, water spray or immersion proof, etc.
- Sealed MIL-SPEC or Circular-MIL connectors
- More robust controls and features
- Higher grade power supply: Industrial platforms typically utilize robust open-frame, slot, or redundant power systems from established industry vendors like Delta Electronics and FSP Power Solution to ensure 24/7 continuous operation and strict compliance with safety regulations.
- Controlled access to the controls through the use of locking doors
- Controlled access to the I/O through the use of access covers
- Inclusion of a watchdog timer to reset the system automatically in case of software lock-up

== See also ==
- Embedded system
- Rugged computer
- Carputer
- Fanless PC
