= Monitor mount =

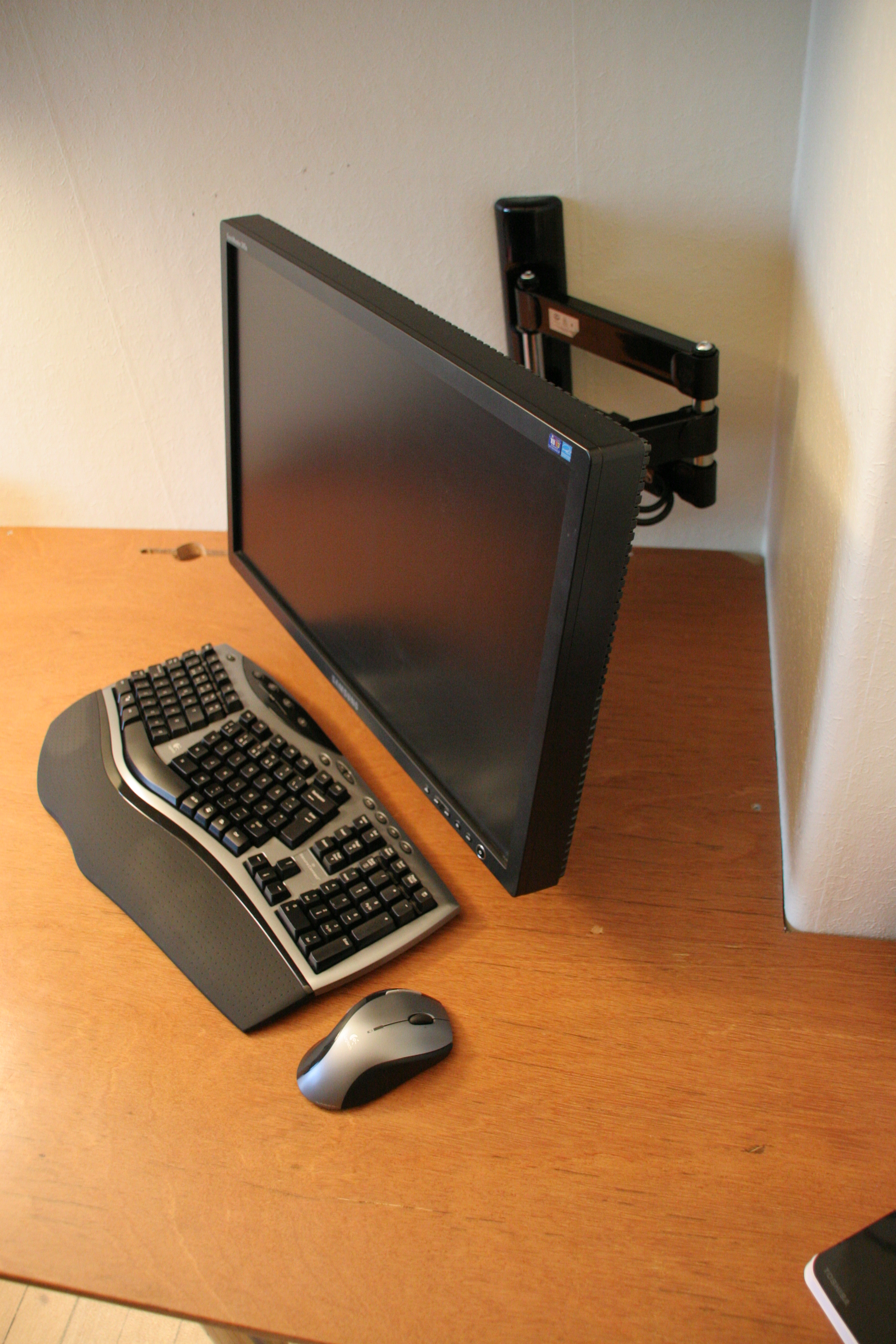
Samsung monitor with VESA mount

A monitor mount is a supportive bracket or arm designed to hold up a computer monitor, laptop, notebook or other display screen. Monitor arm and monitor bracket are other common terms for this device.

== History ==
Flat panel monitors became increasingly popular as the technology grew less expensive during early to mid 2000s. These lighter monitors were better suited for a wider range of movement than the heavier cathode ray tube monitor that was previously sold with most computers. The patent for inventing the monitor mount belongs to Rob Mossman and is dated from September 20, 2006; however monitor mounts have been available for at least six years before the patent was issued. Several companies like Ergotron, Multibrackets ab, Mount- it, Loctek and Herman Miller have been producing mounts since the early 2000s.

== Significance ==
The added functionality of monitor mounts has made them very popular. Depending on the model, monitor mounts can move up and down, rotate, tilt, retract and swivel. VESA is an organization that manages the standards for mounting solutions. In 1997, VESA came up with a standard hole size and screwing pattern for flat panel screens, called Flat Display Mounting Interface (usually known as VESA mount), which is still valid today. Almost all monitor mounts follow this VESA standard in one form or another. Monitor manufacturers typically create a standard VESA hole pattern on the back of the monitor for mounting purposes.

== Health advantages ==
A monitor mount placed at the appropriate height, distance and angle can help “prevent possible health effects such as excessive fatigue, eye strain, and neck and back pain,”. Monitor mounts are especially important for anyone using a standing or walking desk because of the dynamic height and stability requirements for those applications.

Monitor mounts offer ergonomic benefits by allowing users to adjust screen height, tilt, and angle, promoting a neutral neck position and reducing musculoskeletal strain. They help minimize eye strain by ensuring an optimal viewing distance and angle. By freeing up desk space, mounts support better posture, leading to reduced muscle fatigue. Dual or triple screen setups enhance productivity and decrease cognitive fatigue. Proper screen positioning, especially in dynamic work environments like adjustable desks, ensures consistent ergonomic benefits.

== Types ==
Installation

- Wall-mounted – mounts onto a wall.
- Clamp – clamp hardware fastens to edge of a desk.
- Grommet – hardware is inserted through a hole in the desk and secured underneath.

Common workstation setups

- Single monitor arm – the most common usage.
- Multiple monitor arms – with the rise of multi-screen setups, mounts with multiple monitor arms are becoming more common.
- Laptop arm – designed to support a laptop.
- Mixed-use – dual-arm mount supporting a monitor and a laptop or tablet.
- Portable monitor mounts - designed with travelers in mind, they securely fasten monitors to tables or other surfaces.
