= Carputer =

Automotive computer

A carputer, or car-puter, is a computer with specializations to run in a car, such as compact size, low power requirement, and some customized components. The computing hardware is typically based on standard PCs or mobile devices. They normally have standard interfaces such as Bluetooth, USB, and Wi-Fi. The first carputer was introduced by Clarion on December 4, 1998, although on-board diagnostics have been employed since the 1980s to precisely measure the amount of fuel entering the engine as the carburetors got too complex.

A challenge to installing a computer in a car is the power supply. Energy is supplied as a nominal 12 VDC in cars or 24 VDC in some trucks. The voltage varies according to whether the engine is on or off since the battery generally delivers 12V, while the generator supplies more. There can be peaks, and at ignition time the supply current drops. External DC/DC converters can help to regulate voltages.

Police cars often have mobile data terminals in the form of a laptop swivel mounted where the driver's armrest would be. This can be used to log data and to query networked databases.

Microsoft developed Windows Embedded Automotive and used it with the AutoPC, a brand of carputer jointly developed with Clarion. The system was released in 1998, and referred to the operating system itself as "Auto PC". It was based on Windows CE 2.0. It evolved into "Windows CE for Automotive". The platform was used for the first two generations of MyFord Touch while the third generation runs QNX from BlackBerry Limited.

Tablet computers such as the Nexus 7 can be installed either permanently (in-dash) or temporarily (a dock). They can be used for watching movies or listening to music, as well as for GPS navigation, and also have Bluetooth for hands-free calls.

Especially in the 2000s, some enthusiasts put computers in their cars and attached a screen to the dashboard to play MP3s and the like.

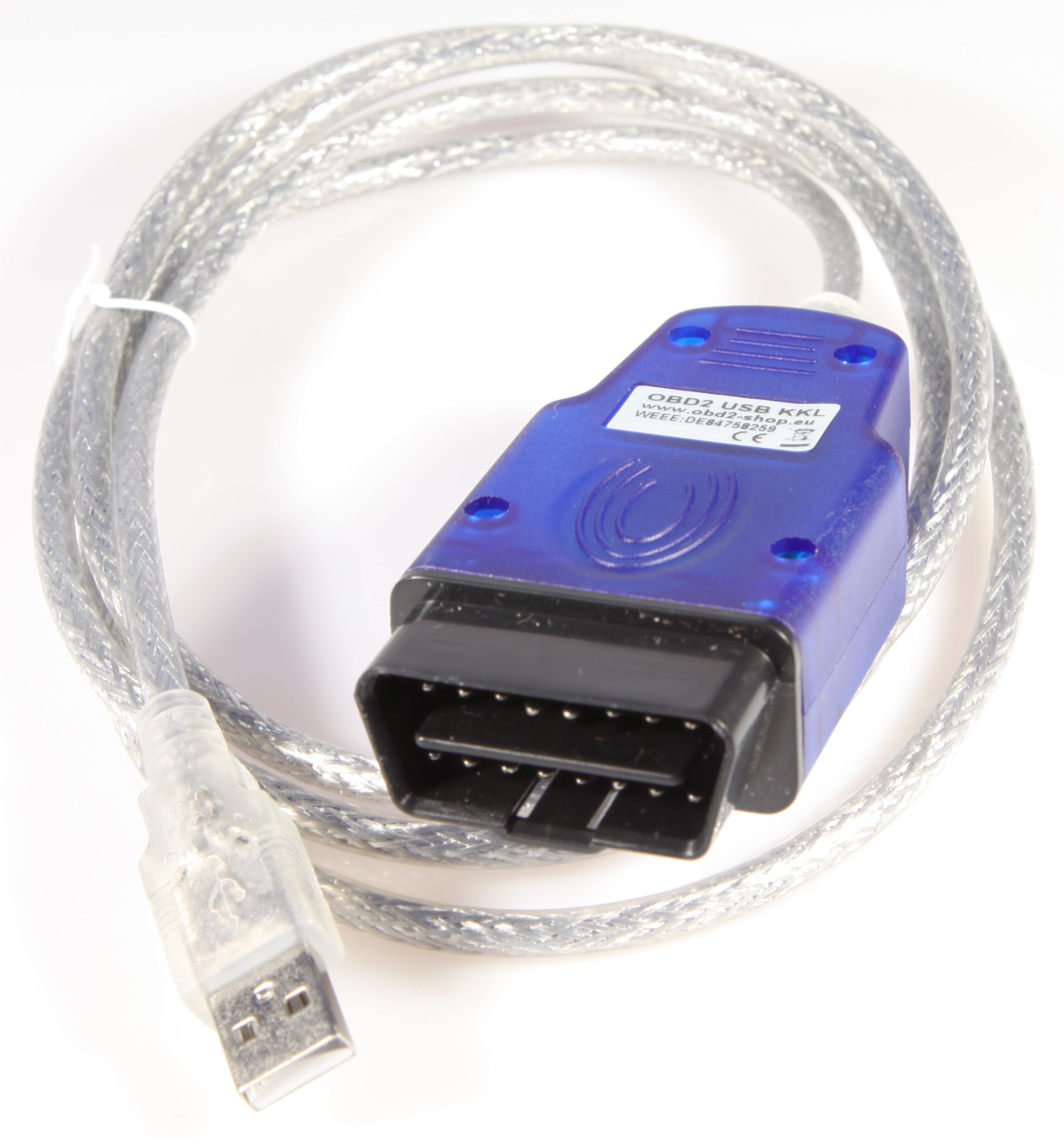
Typical simple USB KKL Diagnostic Interface without protocol logic for signal level adjustment

Computers can be used to decode on-board diagnostics (OBD) data to a visual display. Many interfaces are based on the ELM327 OBD Interpreter ICs. STN1110 is also known to be used.

== See also ==
- Vehicular communication systems
- Industrial PC
- Panel PC
- All-in-one computer (AIO)
