= VESA mount =

Standards defined by VESA for mounting flat panel displays to stands or wall mounts

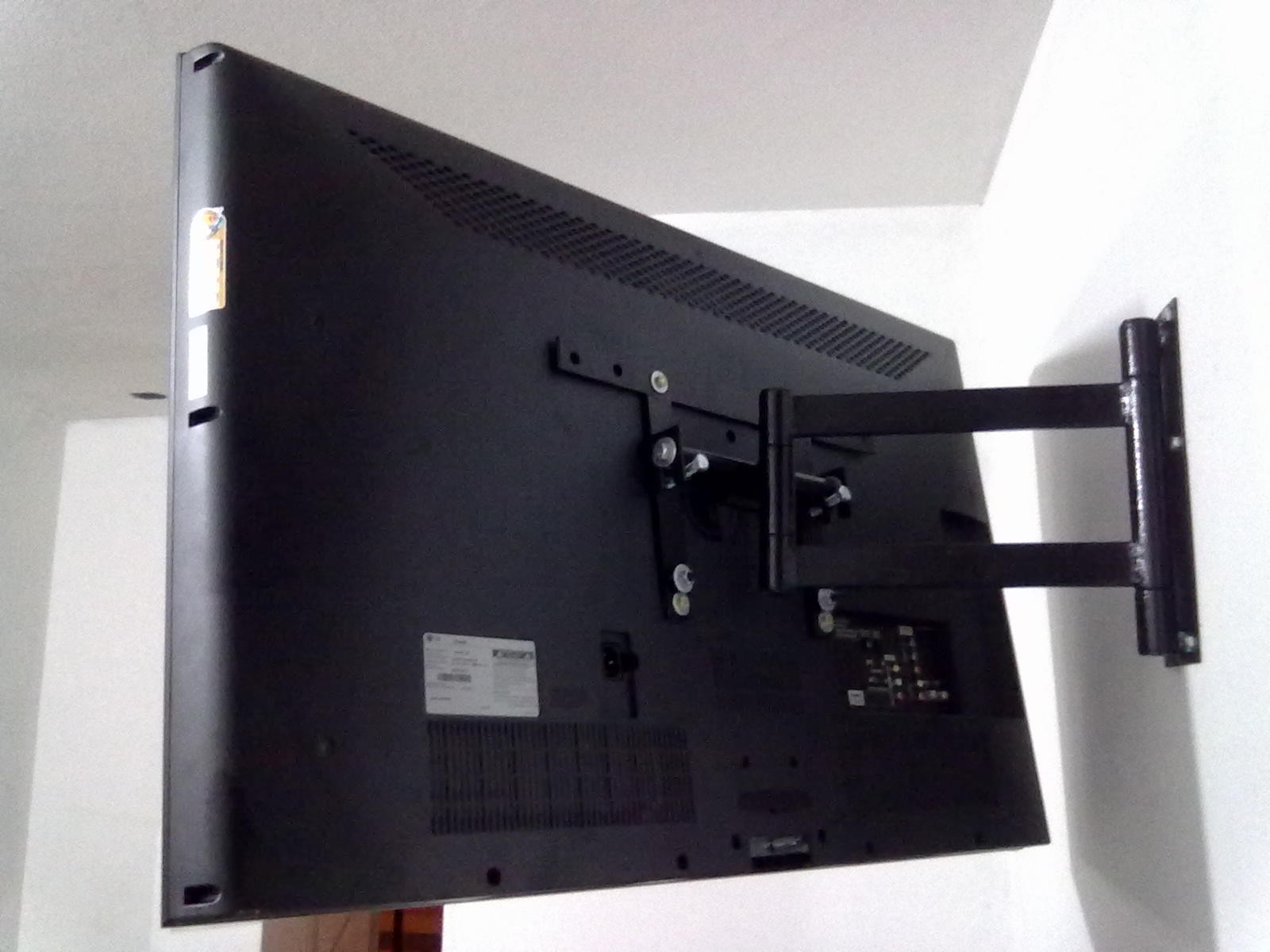
A TV mounted to a wall using a VESA mount

The Flat Display Mounting Interface (FDMI), also known as VESA Mounting Interface Standard (MIS) or colloquially as VESA mount, is a family of standards defined by the Video Electronics Standards Association for mounting flat-panel displays, televisions, and other displays to stands or wall mounts. It is implemented on most modern flat-panel monitors and televisions.

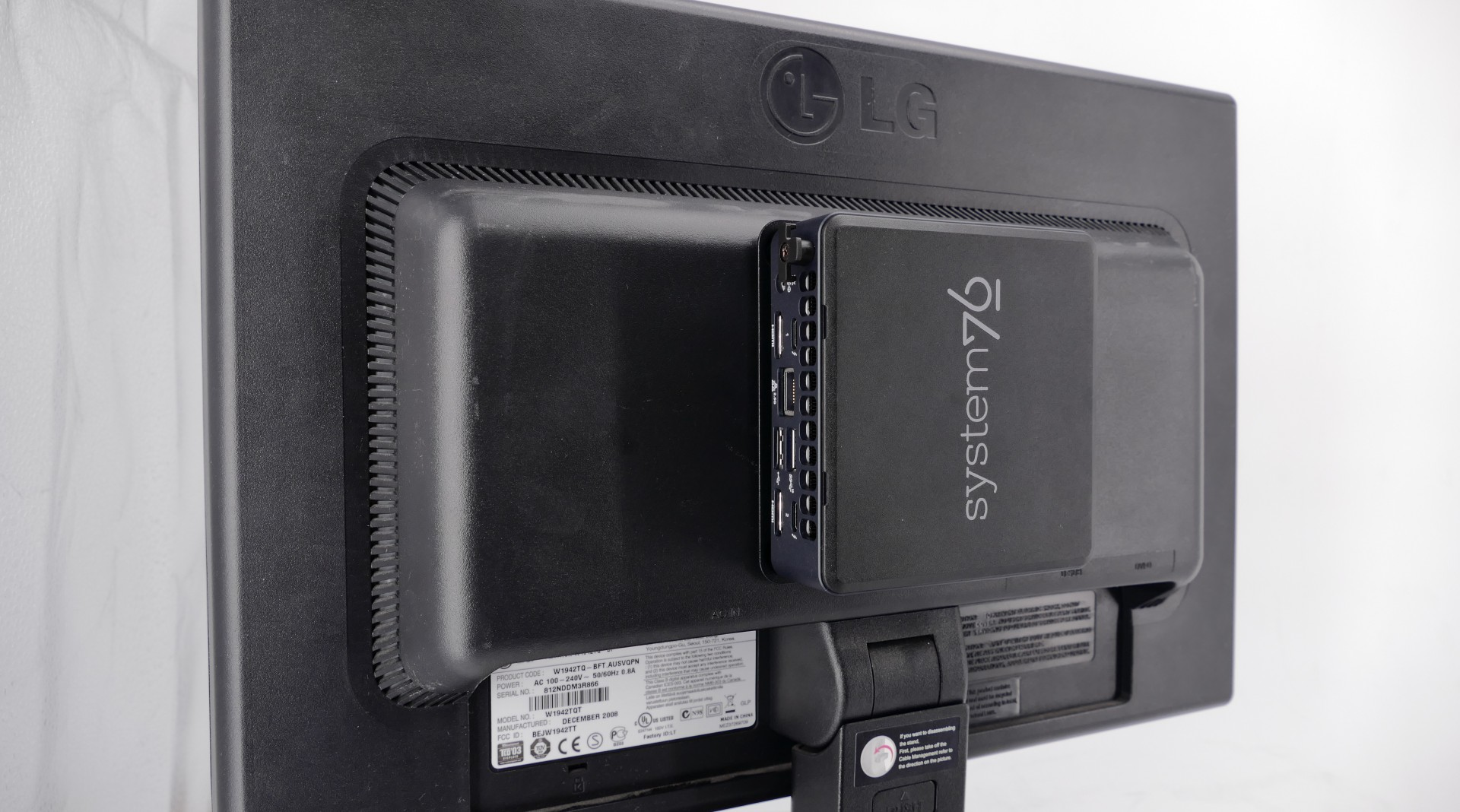
A mini computer mounted to the back of a monitor using VESA mounting screw holes

As well as being used for mounting monitors, the standards can be used to attach a small PC to the monitor mount.

The first standard in this family was introduced in 1997 and was originally called Flat Panel Monitor Physical Mounting Interface (FPMPMI), it corresponds to part D of the current standard.

== Variants ==
Most sizes of VESA mount have four screw-holes arranged in a square on the mount, with matching threaded holes on the device. The horizontal and vertical distance between the screw centres respectively labelled as 'A', and 'B'. The original layout was a square of 100mm. A 75 mm × 75 mm (3.0 in × 3.0 in) was defined for smaller displays. Later, variants were added for screens with as small as a 4 inches (10 cm) diagonal.

The FDMI was extended in 2006 with additional screw patterns that are more appropriate for larger TV screens. Thus the standard now specifies seven sizes, each with more than one variant. These are referenced as parts B to F of the standard or with official abbreviations, usually prefixed by the word "VESA".

Unofficially, the variants are sometimes referenced as just "VESA" followed by the pattern size in mm, which is slightly ambiguous for the names "VESA 50" (four possibilities), "VESA 75" (two possibilities) and "VESA 200" (three possibilities). However, if "VESA 100" is accepted as meaning the original variant ("VESA MIS-D, 100"), then all but "VESA MIS-E" and "VESA MIS-F, 200" have at least one unique dimension that can be used in this way, as can be seen from the tables below.

A 30″ LCD television on a VESA 200 (VESA MIS-E, C or VESA MIS-F, 200, 6) mount

Table 1: Parts of VESA MIS
Part	Display				Pattern sizes	Screw size	
Part	Diagonal, min.		Weight, max.		Pattern sizes	Thread	Length excl. bracket
MIS-	(in)	(mm)	(kg)	(lb)	(mm)	Thread	(mm)
B	4	102	2	4.4	20×50	M4	4.0
C	8	203	4.5	10	35×75	M4	5.4
D 75mm	12	305	8	17.5	75×75, 50×75	M4	7.4
D	12	305	14	30.8	100×100, 50×100	M4	7.4
E	23	584	22.7	50	100×200, 50×200	M4	7.4
F M6	31	785	50	110	200×200 and up	M6	9 / 10 / 12
F M8	31	785	113.6	250	200×200 and up	M8	12 / 15 / 16

Notes

- If a screen is heavier or larger than specified in table 1, it should use a larger variant from the table, for instance, a 30-in LCD TV weighing more than 50 lb (23 kg) would need to use a part F mount.
- The weight limits were chosen as round numbers in kg or lb for different sizes.
- The screw lengths for parts C, D and E become whole numbers when adding a 2.6 mm thick bracket (which is how the standard describes them).
- The screw lengths for part F are minimum / maximum / hole maximum, as in: M6 screws must go at least 9 mm in but at most 10 mm in, and the hole might not be deeper than 12 mm.

== Details of variant B to E ==
Hole placement etc. for "VESA MIS-E" mounts, showing many of the details described in the article

Table 2: Part B to E center mounts
Variant		Hole pattern				Clearance depth, max.	Steel thickness, typical
Part	Label	Size		Count		Clearance depth, max.	Steel thickness, typical
Part	Label	Height	Width	Height	Width	Clearance depth, max.	Steel thickness, typical
Part	Label	(mm)	(mm)	Height	Width	(mm)	(mm)
B	MIS-B, C	20	50	2	2	6	2
C	MIS-C, C	35	75	2	2	8	2.6
D 75mm	MIS-D, 75, C	75	75	2	2	10	2.6
D	MIS-D, 100, C	100	100	2	2	10	2.6
E	MIS-E, C	100	200	2	3	10	2.6

Notes for centre mounts

- The mounting pattern must be centred between left and right of the screen case.
- For part D and E, it must also be centred between top and bottom (since 2006).

Table 3: Part B to E edge mounts
Variant		Hole pattern				Clearance depth, max.	Steel thickness, typical	Edge distance
Part	Label	Size		Count		Clearance depth, max.	Steel thickness, typical	Edge distance
Part	Label	Height	Width	Height	Width	Clearance depth, max.	Steel thickness, typical	Edge distance
Part	Label	(mm)	(mm)	Height	Width	(mm)	(mm)	(mm)
B	MIS-B, x	20	50	2	2	6	2	10
C	MIS-C, x	35	75	2	2	8	2.6	12.5
D 75mm	MIS-D, 75, x	50	75	2	2	10	2.6	10
D	MIS-D, 100, x	50	100	2	2	10	2.6	10
E	MIS-E, x	50	200	2	3	10	2.6	10

Notes for the edge mounts:

- x is "T", "B", "R" or "L" for "Top", "Bottom", "Right" or "Left" as seen from the back in landscape mode.
- More than one x or "C" can be specified for a screen with more than one set of mounting holes.
- For left or right edge mounting, Swap width and height, so the brackets will look the same with respect to all 4 edges.
- The rounded rectangles and distances (see below) do not apply towards the edge, except that the surface on the screen need not touch the bracket beyond them.
- The distance from the edge of the screen case to the centre of the first holes is ±0.5 mm.

=== Common notes for variants B to E ===
- Screws are standard M4 machine screws as long as the bracket is thick plus the length given in table 1.
- Each hole must be within ±0.25 mm of its nominal position.
- Each hole in the bracket is 5 mm in diameter to allow for this tolerance in both screen and bracket.
- If the screen manufacturer included different screws, they must be used, not the ones that came with the bracket.
- If the screen manufacturer provides their own mount, it may be attached in any way as long as it can be removed.
- The clearance area must be a completely flat surface at most "max. clearance" above or below the general back surface of the screen.
- The clearance area is a rounded rectangle whose sides extends at least 8.5 mm beyond the hole centres and with a corner radius of at most 7 mm.
- The bracket is within a rounded rectangle whose sides extend at most 7.5 mm beyond the hole centres and with a corner radius of at least 6 mm.
- The part of the bracket laying against the clearance area must be at least 12.5 mm wide, it may be straight or diagonal.
- The two extra holes in type E brackets are in the middle of the long sides of the hole pattern, see the drawing.
- The screen manufacturer should warrant that filling the standard holes with the specified screws will be able to hold the screen in any direction.
- The bracket manufacturer should warrant that the bracket can carry the maximum weight from table 1 when using all the specified screws.

More details can be found by purchasing a copy of the standard itself, including rules to ensure cables don't prevent using the mounts.

== Details of variant F ==
Table 4: Part F center mounts
Variant		Hole pattern			
Part	Label	Size		Count	
Part	Label	Height	Width	Height	Width
Part	Label	(mm)	(mm)	Height	Width
F	MIS-F, 200, yn, 6/8	200	200	2	2
F	MIS-F, 300, yn, 6/8	300	300	2	3
F	MIS-F, 400, yn, 6/8	400	400	2	4
F	MIS-F, 500, yn, 6/8	500	500	2	5
F	MIS-F, 600, yn, 6/8	600	600	2	6
F	MIS-F, 700, yn, 6/8	700	700	2	7
F	MIS-F, 800, yn, 6/8	800	800	2	8
F	MIS-F, 900, yn, 6/8	900	900	2	9
F	MIS-F, 1000, yn, 6/8	1000	1000	2	10

- yn is Y if the screen can be turned 90 degrees (to alternate between portrait and landscape orientations), N if it cannot.
- 6/8 is 6 for M6 screws, 8 for M8 screws.
- The 2006 edition of the VESA standard is very clear that the type F pattern is always square, and that the odd sizes 300×300, 500×500, 700×700 and 900×900 are allowed too.

=== Common notes for variant F ===
- Screws are standard M6 or M8 machine screws as long as the bracket is thick plus the length given in table 1.
- Each hole must be within ±0.5 mm of its nominal position.
- If the screen manufacturer included different screws they must be used, not the ones that came with the bracket.
- If the screen manufacturer provides their own mount, it may be attached in any way as long as it can be removed.
- The hole pattern is a square with holes along the sides only, holes are every 100 mm along the edges, and there are no holes in the square.
- The bracket is two strips that fit either the left and right or the top and bottom row of holes, and the holes along the two other edges of the square are not used at the same time.
- The screen manufacturer may omit some of the holes except the outer corners if the remaining holes are enough to carry the weight of the screen and its official add-ons (such as their own sound bar).
- The mounting area must be the part of the screen furthest towards the back (so no part of the screen may extend further back).
- The mounting area touching the bracket must be at least 35 mm wide, and the two halves of the bracket itself may be up to 100 mm wide each.
- Around each mounting hole in the screen, there must be a gripping area for the bracket at least 10 mm (M6)/12 mm (M8).
- The 35 mm wide areas touching the bracket may deviate at most ±1 mm from complete flatness.
- The screen manufacturer should warrant that filling the provided holes in either the horizontal or vertical edge (at user's choice) with the specified screws will be able to hold the screen in any direction.
- The bracket manufacturer should warrant that the bracket can carry the advertised weight when using a few of the included screws (but at least the 4 corners) as would be needed if those were standard industrial grade screws.
- The end user or contractor should warrant that the wall, ceiling, floor or wherever else the bracket is hung can handle the load safely and within the local building code.

More details can be found by purchasing a copy of the standard itself, including rules to ensure cables don't prevent using the mounts.

=== Common deviations from variant F ===
In practice, many screens that almost comply with part F of the standard deviate in various minor ways, and most brands of compliant brackets are designed to handle these deviations with little or no trouble for the end user:

- Non-square patterns, such as 600 × 200 mm and 600 × 400 mm and 800 × 400 mm. These were apparently permitted by the version 1 (2002) standard. The labeling for these may have been "MIS-F, width, height" e.g. "MIS-F, 600, 200" for 600 × 200 mm.
- A somewhat strange pattern of 280 × 150 mm.
- Various protrusions on the screen extending a few millimeters further back than the mounting surfaces.

== Compliance ==
Manufacturers of FDMI compliant devices can license the use of a hexagonal "VESA mounting compliant" logo.

Many compliant or almost compliant devices do not display the logo, as is reflected by the absence of most key vendors from VESA's own public list of licensed manufacturers. Of the members of the standard committee (Ergotron, Peerless Industries, HP, Samsung, Sanus, ViewSonic and Vogel), only Ergotron is on the list.

As mentioned above under variant F, there are many almost compliant screens on the market, and some of those use the "VESA" name loosely to refer to their similar mounting patterns.
