= ELM327 =

Programmed microcontroller

The ELM327 is a programmed microcontroller produced for translating the on-board diagnostics (OBD) interface found in most modern cars. The ELM327 command protocol is one of the most popular PC-to-OBD interface standards and is also implemented by other vendors.

The original ELM327 was implemented on the PIC18F2480 microcontroller from Microchip Technology.

While in business, ELM Electronics also sold other variants of the product, with slightly different part numbers, which implemented only a subset of the OBD protocols.

In June 2020, ELM Electronics announced it was closing the business in June 2022.

== Uses ==
The ELM327 abstracts the low-level protocol and presents a simple interface that can be called via a UART, typically by a hand-held diagnostic tool or a computer program connected by USB, RS-232, Bluetooth or Wi-Fi. New applications include smartphones.

There are a large number of programs available that connect to the ELM327.

The function of such software may include supplementary vehicle instrumentation, reporting and clearing of error codes.

ELM327 functions:

- Read diagnostic trouble codes, both generic and manufacturer-specific.
- Clear some trouble codes and turn off the MIL (malfunction indicator light, more commonly known as the check engine light)
- Display current sensor data
- Engine RPM
- Calculated load value
- Coolant temperature
- Fuel system status
- Vehicle speed
- Short term fuel trim
- Long term fuel trim
- Intake manifold pressure
- Timing advance
- Intake air temperature
- Air flow rate
- Absolute throttle position
- Oxygen sensor voltages/associated short term fuel trims
- Fuel pressure

== Protocols supported ==
The protocols supported by ELM327 are:

- SAE J1850 PWM (41.6 kbit/s)
- SAE J1850 VPW (10.4 kbit/s)
- ISO 9141-2 (5 baud init, 10.4 kbit/s)
- ISO 14230-4 KWP (5 baud init, 10.4 kbit/s)
- ISO 14230-4 KWP (fast init, 10.4 kbit/s)
- ISO 15765-4 CAN (11 bit ID, 500 kbit/s)
- ISO 15765-4 CAN (29 bit ID, 500 kbit/s)
- ISO 15765-4 CAN (11 bit ID, 250 kbit/s)
- ISO 15765-4 CAN (29 bit ID, 250 kbit/s)
- SAE J1939 (250kbit/s)
- SAE J1939 (500kbit/s)

== Command set ==
The ELM327 command set is similar to the Hayes AT commands.

== Other versions ==
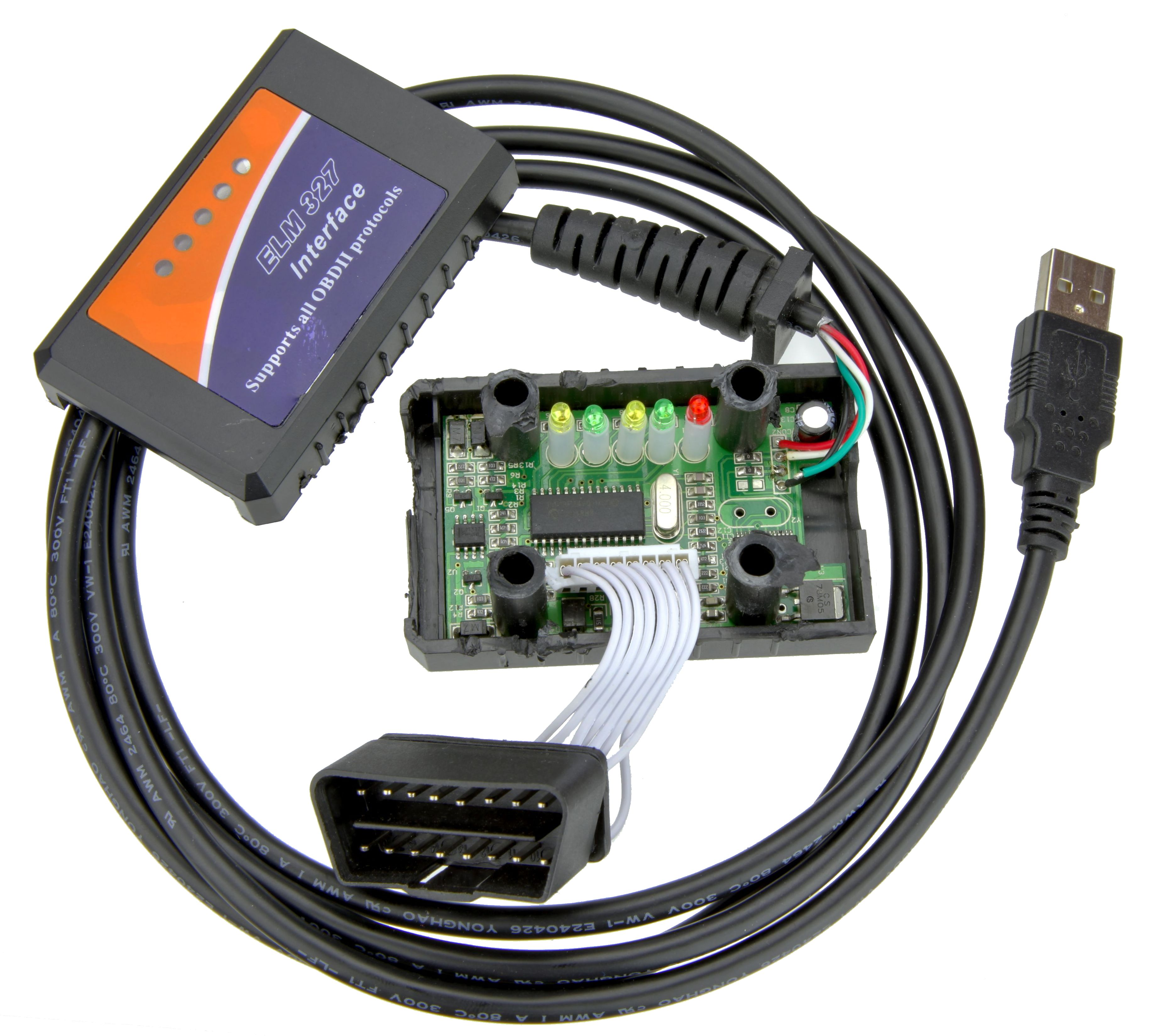
Typical cheap ELM327 copy without label on the controller

The ELM327 is a PIC microcontroller that has been customized with ELM Electronics' proprietary code that implements the testing protocols. When ELM Electronics sold version 1.4 of its ELM327, it did not enable the copy protection feature of the PIC microcontroller. Consequently, anyone who had bought a genuine ELM327-v1.4 could use a device programmer to read ELM's proprietary microcontroller firmware as a binary blob. Pirates could trivially produce an ELM327 clone by purchasing the same microcontroller chip and programming it with the copied blob. ELM327 copies were widely sold in devices claiming to contain an ELM327 device, and problems have been reported with the copies. The problems reflect bugs that were present in ELM's version 1.4 microcode; those making the clones may continue to sell the old version.

Although these copies may contain the ELM327 v1.4 code, they may falsely report the version number as the current version provided by the genuine ELM327, and in some cases report an as-yet non-existent version. Released software versions for the ELM327 are 1.0, 1.0a, 1.1, 1.2, 1.2a, 1.3, 1.3a, 1.4, 1.4b, 2.0, 2.1, 2.2 and 2.3 only. The actual functions of these copies are nonetheless limited to the functions of the original ELM327 v1.4, with their inherent deficiencies.

== Version outline ==
v1.0 Initial public release, the ELM327 v1.0 supported: – SAEJ1850 PWM and VPW,- – ISO 9141-2 (10.4 and 9.6 kbit/s), – ISO 14230-4 (10.4 and 9.6 kbit/s), – ISO 15765-4 CAN (250 and 500 kbit/s)- The RS232 baud rates were only 9.6 kbit/s or 38.4 kbit/s

v1.0a – J1850 VPW timing adjustment for some ’99 – ’00 GM trucks.

v1.1 – Introduced Programmable Parameters – Added Flow Control commands

v1.2 – RS232 baud rates are adjustable to 500 kbit/s – Programmable Parameters can be reset with a jumper – Introduced Adaptive Timing – Added SAE J1939 support (protocol A) – Added user defined CAN protocols B and C – Modified KWP protocols to allow four byte headers

v1.2a – Changed error detection to catch KWP 4 byte headers if no data or checksum – Added check to prevent CAN mask corruption on certain Flow Control sends

v1.3 – Adaptive Timing tuned a little differently – Several J1939 improvements – New CAN CRA commands to help setting masks and filters – New CAN D0/D1 commands for printing of message dlc – New CAN RTR command for sending same – Added space character control in responses – New STOPPED message for user interrupts during searches – Introduced LV RESET message for resets from low voltage – New @2 and @3 commands for storing of unique identifier – Added ability to state the number of responses desired

v1.3a (still available) – Added wiring checks for when the J1962 CAN pins are used for other functions

v1.4 – Added Low Power mode (‘sleep’ function) – Added extended addressing mode for CAN protocols – Added 4800 baud ISO 9141 and ISO 14230 support – Allow manual control over ISO 9141 and ISO 14230 initiation – Provided a single EEPROM byte for user data storage – All interrupts now say STOPPED (not just when searching) – Many new Programmable Parameters and additions

v1.4a Elm Electronics never made a v1.4a

v1.4b (no longer available) – New CSM command to have active or passive CAN monitoring – New CRA command to quickly reset changed masks and filters – Several SAE J1939 updates

v1.5 Elm Electronics never made a v1.5

v2.0 – New Activity Monitor watches OBD pins – Wake from Low Power now retains settings – AT CRAs accept ‘don’t care’s (X’s) – New PP’s provide extensive ISO/KWP control – Increased the RS232 Tx buffer to 512 bytes – Brownout reset voltage reduced to 2.8V

v2.1 – Speed increases – Processes ‘Response Pending’ (7F xx 78) replies – CAN searches now measure frequency and require a match

v2.2 – AT CS command now shows CAN frequency – Added 12500 and 15625 bit/s ISO/KWP baud rates – New AT CER hh command allows defining the CEA Rx address – New IFR modes 4,5,6 control J1850 IFR sending while monitoring – Added PP 1F to allow KWP length to include the checksum byte – Increased PP19 from 31 to 4F

v2.3 (latest release) – New AT FT command adds another layer of filtering – Added three CAN Flow Control modes for experimenters – Response Pending now works with CAN Extended Addressing – New AT IA, and C0/C1 commands – Better noise tolerance on RS232 Rx

Slightly more detailed changes may be viewed in their latest datasheet in the version history chapter (pag. 94-95).

== See also ==
- On-Board Diagnostics
- OBD-II PIDs
- OBDuino
- OpenXC
